The 1919 New Year Honours were appointments by King George V to various orders and honours to reward and highlight good works by citizens of the British Empire. The appointments were published in The London Gazette and The Times in January 1919.

The recipients of honours are displayed here as they were styled before their new honour, and arranged by honour, with classes (Knight, Knight Grand Cross, etc.) and then divisions (Military, Civil, etc.) as appropriate.

United Kingdom and British Empire

Baronetcies 
Sir Lewis Amherst Selby-Bigge  Secretary to the Board of Education
Sir Maurice William Ernest de Bunsen  formerly His Britannic Majesty's Ambassador Extraordinary and Plenipotentiary at Vienna
The Right Honourable Judge John Ross, Judge of the High Court of Justice in Ireland, Chancery Division

Knight Bachelor 
His Honour Judge Edward Bray, Judge of the Bloomsbury County Court; Chairman of the Council of County Court Judges
Thomas Willes Chitty, Master of the Supreme Court of Justice, King's Bench Division
Sigmund Dannreuther, Controller and Accounting Officer, Ministry of Munitions
Patrick Quinn 
Robert Blyth Greig  Scottish Board of Agriculture
Lucas White King 
William Leslie Mackenzie  Medical Member of the Local Government Board for Scotland
Hugh William Orange  Accountant General, Board of Education
Alfred Walter Soward  a Commissioner of Inland Revenue; Secretary, Estate Duty Office
Richard Stephens Taylor, President of the Law Society; Chairman of Law Society Advisory Committee; and Chairman of Civil Liabilities Committee.
George Danvers Thane  Principal Inspector under Cruelty to Animals Act Home Office

British India
Justice Ernest Edward Fletcher, a Puisne Judge of the High Court at Calcutta
George Cochrane Godfrey, Coal Controller in India
Robert Herriot Henderson  Assam
William Arthur Beardsell, Sheriff of Madras
Prafulla Chandra Ray  late Provincial Educational Service, Bengal
Chimanlal Harilal Setalvad, Vice-Chancellor, Bombay University 
Joseph Henry Stone  Director of Public Instruction, Madras

Dominions
Leicester Paul Beaufort  lately Judge of the High Court of Northern Rhodesia
The Honourable Worley Bassett Edwards, a Judge of the Supreme Court of the Dominion of New Zealand
Walter Edwin Gurney, lately Controller and Auditor-General of the Union of South Africa
Thomas Wagstaffe Haycraft, the Chief Justice of Grenada
John Hewat  Lieutenant-Colonel, South African Defence Force, Member of the House of Assembly of the Union of South Africa and Assistant Director of Medical Services of the said Union
Samuel Hordern, of the City of Sydney, President of the Royal Agricultural Society of New South Wales
Henry Jones, of the City of Hobart, in the State of Tasmania
Joseph James Kinsey, of the City of Christchurch, in the Dominion of New Zealand
James William Murison  Judge of the Court for Zanzibar
Boshan Wei Yuk  formerly Unofficial Member of the Legislative Council of the Colony of Hong Kong

The Most Honourable Order of the Bath

Knight Grand Cross of the Order of the Bath (GCB)

Military Division 
Royal Navy
Acting Admiral Sir Charles Edward Madden 

Army
General Sir Charles Carmichael Monro 

For valuable services rendered in connection with the military operations in France and Flanders:
General Sir Henry Seymour Rawlinson 
General The Honourable Sir Julian Hedworth George Byng 
General Sir William Riddell Birdwood  Indian Army

Civil Division 
The Right Honourable Sir Eric Campbell Geddes  First Lord of the Admiralty

Knight Commander of the Order of the Bath (KCB)

Military Division 
Royal Navy
Vice-Admiral Trevylyan Dacres Willis Napier 
Rear-Admiral Arthur Cavenagh Leveson  
Rear-Admiral Sydney Robert Fremantle 
Rear-Admiral William Edmund Goodenough 
Rear-Admiral Edwyn Sinclair Alexander-Sinclair 
Rear-Admiral Walter Henry Cowan 
Paymaster Captain Francis Harrison Smith 

Army
Major-General George Joseph Hamilton Evatt 
Major-General Charles Harington Harington  
Lieutenant-General Thomas Herbert John Chapman Goodwin  Army Medical Service

For valuable services rendered in connection with the military operations in France and Flanders:
Major-General Cameron Deane Shute 
Major-General David Graham Mushcet Campbell 
Major-General Charles Henry Burtchaell  Army Medical Service
Major-General Reginald Byng Stephens 
Major-General William Charles Giffard Heneker  
Major-General Evan Eyare Carter 
Lieutenant-General Sir Claud William Jacob  
Major-General Archibald Armar Montgomery  
Major-General Gerard Moore Heath 
Major-General William George Bertram Boyce 
Major-General Arlington Augustus Chichester 
Major-General John Humphrey Davidson  
Major-General Travers Edwards Clarke 

Canadian Forces
Major-General Archibald Cameron Macdonell 

Australian Forces
Major-General Charles Rosenthal 

For valuable services rendered in connection with Military Operations in Egypt:
Major-General Sir Walter Campbell  
Major-General Sir Louis Jean Bols 

For valuable services rendered in connection with Military Operations in Salonika:
Major-General George Townshend Forestier-Walker 

Royal Air Force
Major-General Frederick Hugh Sykes 
Major-General William Sefton Brancker 
Major-General John Maitland Salmond

Civil Division 
Robert Elliott-Cooper, Chairman of the War Office Committee on Hutted Camps
James Thomson Currie, Personal Assistant to the Surveyor-General of Supply
William Henry Beveridge  Second Secretary, Ministry of Food
John Westerman Cawston  Deputy Master of the Mint
Malcolm Delevingne  Assistant Under Secretary of State, Home Office
Joshua Albert Flynn  Acting Permanent Secretary, Ministry of Munitions
Sir George Vandeleur Fiddes  Permanent Under Secretary of State, Colonial Office
George Fottrell, Clerk of the Crown and Peace for County and City of Dublin
Albert Gray  Counsel to Chairman of Committees, House of Lords
Sir Esmé William Howard  His Britannic Majesty's Envoy Extraordinary and Minister Plenipotentiary at Stockholm
James Edward Masterton-Smith  Assistant Secretary, Ministry of Munitions
Ernest Robert Moon  Counsel to the Right Honourable The Speaker
William Arthur Robinson  Secretary to the Air Ministry
Malcolm Cotter Cariston Seton  Secretary to the Judicial and Public Department, India Office
William Sutherland, Private Secretary to the Prime Minister
Graeme Thomson  Director of Transport, Ministry of Shipping
John Charles Gabriel Sykes, Secretary to the Liquor Control Board

Companion of the Order of the Bath (CB)

Military Division 
Royal Navy
Vice-Admiral Francis Spurstow Miller
Captain Sir Malcolm MacGregor 
Captain Michael Henry Hodges 
Captain Hugh Justin Tweedie 
Captain Douglas Lionel Dent 
Captain Frederick Aubrey Whitehead 
Captain John Donald Kelly 
Captain Henry Tritton Buller 
Captain John William Leopold McClintock 
Captain Berwick Curtis 
Engineer Captain Edward John Weeks 
Commander Archibald Bertram Watson Higginson 
Commander Edward Altham 
Paymaster Commander Bertram Cowles Allen 

Army
Temp Major-General Fabian Arthur Goulstone Ware  General List
Colonel Chailes Henry Cowie  Royal Engineers
Lieutenant-Colonel and Brevet Colonel James Gurwood King-King  late Royal West Surrey Regiment
Lieutenant-Colonel and Brevet Colonel Robert James Ross  Staff
Lieutenant-Colonel and Brevet Colonel Geoffrey Herbert Anthony White  Royal Artillery
Major and Brevet Colonel Walter Mervyn St. George Kirke  Royal Artillery
Colonel Charles Kenyon Burnett  late 18th Hussars
Major and Brevet Colonel Charles Parker Deedes  Yorkshire Light Infantry
Lieutenant-Colonel Fernaud Gustavo Eugene Cannot  Royal Army Service Corps
Major and Brevet Lieutenant-Colonel Arthur Olver  Royal Army Veterinary Corps
Colonel Arundel Martyn 

For valuable services rendered in connection with the military operations in France and Flanders:
Colonel Charles Edward Baddeley 
Colonel John Cecil Wray  Royal Artillery
Lieutenant-Colonel Thomas Ogilvie  Gordon Highlanders
Colonel Charles Augustus Young  Army Medical Service
Temp Colonel Andrew Fullerton  Army Medical Service
Colonel Neil Wolseley Haig 
Lieutenant-Colonel and Brevet Colonel Ernest Wright Alexander  Royal Artillery
Lieutenant-Colonel and Brevet Colonel Harry Stebbing Bush  Royal Army Ordnance Corps
Lieutenant-Colonel and Brevet Colonel Arthur Wharton Peck  25th Cavalry, Indian Army
Lieutenant-Colonel and Brevet Colonel Francis John Duncan  Royal Scots
Major and Brevet Colonel Gerald Farrell Boyd  Royal Irish Regiment
Major and Brevet Colonel Percival Otway Hambro  15th Hussars
Lieutenant-Colonel and Brevet Colonel John Samuel Jocelyn Percy  East Lancashire Regiment
Lieutenant-Colonel and Brevet Colonel Arthur Solly-Flood  4th Dragoon Guards
Temp Colonel Gerald Charles Adolphe Marescaux  Special List (Royal Navy, Retired)
Temp Colonel Hamilton Ashley Ballance  Army Medical Service
Colonel Thomas Edward Marshall  Royal Artillery
Lieutenant-Colonel and Brevet Colonel George Henry Basil Freeth  Lancashire Fusiliers
Lieutenant-Colonel and Brevet Colonel George Tupper Campbell Carter-Campbell  Scottish Rifles
Colonel Theophilus Percy Jones  Army Medical Service
Colonel Archibald Buchanan Ritchie 
Lieutenant-Colonel and Brevet Colonel Clifford Coffin  Royal Engineers
Lieutenant-Colonel and Brevet Colonel Thomas Aktley Cubitt  Royal Artillery
Major and Brevet Colonel John Cartwright Harding Newman  Essex Regiment
Major and Brevet Colonel Harold Whitla Higginson  Royal Dublin Fusiliers
Lieutenant-Colonel and Brevet Colonel Kenneth John Kincaid-Smith  Royal Artillery
Lieutenant-Colonel and Brevet Colonel Arthur Durham Kirby  Royal Artillery
Major and Brevet Colonel Harry Hugh Sidney Knox  Northamptonshire Regiment
Lieutenant-Colonel and Brevet Colonel John William Fraser Lamont  Royal Artillery
Lieutenant-Colonel and Brevet Colonel William Percival Monkhouse  Royal Artillery
Lieutenant-Colonel and Brevet Colonel William Patrick Eric Newbigging  Manchester Regiment
Lieutenant-Colonel and Brevet Colonel Arthur Montagu Perreau  Royal Artillery
Lieutenant-Colonel and Brevet Colonel George Herbert Sanders  Royal Artillery
Lieutenant-Colonel and Brevet Colonel Herbert Cecil Sheppard  Royal Artillery
Major and Brevet Colonel James Bruce Gregorie Tulloch  Yorkshire Light Infantry
Lieutenant-Colonel and Brevet Colonel William Danvers Waghorn  Royal Engineers
Colonel Douglas Edward Cayley 
Lieutenant-Colonel Charles Donald Raynsford Watts  Royal Army Ordnance Corps
Lieutenant-Colonel Hugh John Males Marshall  Royal Engineers
Lieutenant-Colonel Edward Nathan Whitley  Royal Field Artillery
Lieutenant-Colonel Henry Jenkins Brock  Royal Artillery
Lieutenant-Colonel Herbert Willie Andrew Christie  Royal Artillery
Lieutenant-Colonel Arthur Stawell Jenour  Royal Artillery
Lieutenant-Colonel Norman Bruce Bainbridge  Royal Army Ordnance Corps
Lieutenant-Colonel William Robarts Napier Madocks  Royal Artillery
Lieutenant-Colonel William Frederick Mildren  London Regiment
Major and Brevet Lieutenant-Colonel Robert McDounall  East Kent Regiment
Lieutenant-Colonel Robert Gabbett Parker  East Lancashire Regiment
Major and Brevet Lieutenant-Colonel Cecil Faber Aspinall  Royal Munster Fusiliers
Lieutenant-Colonel Arthur Ellershaw  Royal Artillery
Lieutenant-Colonel Thomas Edward Topping  Royal Field Artillery
Major and Brevet Lieutenant-Colonel Edward Lacy Challenor  Leicestershire Regiment
Major and Brevet Lieutenant-Colonel Ross John Finnis Hayter  Cheshire Regiment
Lieutenant-Colonel William Lushington Osborn  Royal Sussex Regiment
Major and Brevet Lieutenant-Colonel Edward Weyland Martin Powell  late Royal Artillery
Major and Brevet Lieutenant-Colonel Clifton Inglis Stockwell  Royal Welsh Fusiliers
Major and Brevet Lieutenant-Colonel The Honourable Robert White  late Royal Welsh Fusiliers
Temp Lieutenant-Colonel Cyril Aubrey Blacklock  General List
Temp Lieutenant-Colonel Brodie Haldane Henderson  Royal Engineers
Major and Brevet Lieutenant-Colonel Algernon Cautley Jeffcoat  Royal Fusiliers
Major and Brevet Lieutenant-Colonel Lionel Warren de Vere Sadleir-Jackson  9th Lancers
Lieutenant-Colonel Guy Hamilton Boileau  Royal Engineers
Captain and Brevet Lieutenant-Colonel William Thomas Francis Horwood 
Major-General Reginald Ulick Henry Buckland  
Major-General Richard Philips Lee  
Major-General John Moore  
Colonel Reginald Hoare 
Colonel and Honorary Brigadier-General Richard Charles Bernard Lawrence  
Colonel and Honorary Major-General John Elford Dickie  India
Colonel and Honorary Brigadier-General James Evans
Colonel John Vaughan  
Colonel Charles William Brownlow 
Lieutenant-Colonel and Brevet Colonel Richard Pigot Molesworth, Royal Artillery
Colonel Arthur Ernest John Perkins  
Lieutenant-Colonel and Brevet Colonel Hugh Maude de Fellenberg Montgomery  Royal Artillery
Lieutenant-Colonel and Brevet Colonel Torquhil George Matheson  Coldstream Guards
Major and Brevet Colonel John Charteris  Royal Engineers
Major and Brevet Colonel James Kilvington Cochrane, Leinster Regiment
Major and Brevet Colonel Lewis Frederic Green-Wilkinson 
Colonel Arthur Malcolm Tyler 
Temp Colonel George Ernest Gask  Army Medical Service
Temp Colonel Edwin Greenwood Hardy, Remt. Service
Colonel John Poe  Army Medical Service
Major and Brevet Colonel Cyril Norman Macmullen  15th Sikhs, Indian Army
Major and Brevet Colonel Ian Stewart  Scottish Rifles
Rev. James Henry Davey, Royal Army Chaplains' Department
Temp Colonel John Alexander Nixon  Army Medical Service
Temp Colonel William Errington Hume  Army Medical Service
Lieutenant-Colonel, and Brevet Colonel Claud Edward Charles Graham Charlton  Royal Artillery
Lieutenant-Colonel and Brevet Colonel Leopold Charles Louds Oldfield  Royal Artillery
Lieutenant-Colonel and Brevet Pol. Roger Henry Massie, Royal Artillery
Lieutenant-Colonel and Brevet Colonel Henry William Newcombe  Royal Artillery
Major and Brevet Colonel Spencer Edmund Hollond  Rifle Brigade
Lieutenant-Colonel and Brevet Colonel Clive Gordon Pritchard  Royal Artillery
Major and Brevet Colonel Ryves Alexander Mark Currie  Somerset Light Infantry
Lieutenant-Colonel William Kitson Clayton  Royal Army Medical Corps
Lieutenant-Colonel Netterville Guy Barren  Royal Artillery
Lieutenant-Colonel William Legh Palmer, Royal Engineers
Lieutenant-Colonel Durie Parsons  Royal Army Service Corps
Lieutenant-Colonel D'Arcy Legard  17th Lancers
Lieutenant-Colonel Alexander James MacDougall  Royal Army Medical Corps
Lieutenant-Colonel Henry Graham Martin, Royal Army Medical Corps
Lieutenant-Colonel Standish de Couroy O'Grady  Royal Army Medical Corps
Lieutenant-Colonel Henry Herrick  Royal Army Medical Corps
Lieutenant-Colonel Horace Samson Roch  Royal Army Medical Corps
Lieutenant-Colonel Allen Butler Gosset, Cheshire Regiment
Lieutenant-Colonel Ronald Marr Johnson  Royal Artillery
Lieutenant-Colonel William Loring  Royal Garrison Artillery
Lieutenant-Colonel Geoffrey Nowell Salmon  Rifle Brigade
Lieutenant-Colonel William George Thompson  Royal Artillery
Lieutenant-Colonel George Tagore Mair  Royal Artillery
Major and Brevet Lieutenant-Colonel Harry Biddulph  Royal Engineers
Major and Brevet Lieutenant-Colonel Anthony Julian Reddie  South Wales Borderers
Major and Brevet Lieutenant-Colonel Hector Gowans Reid  Royal Army Service Corps
Major and Brevet Lieutenant-Colonel Reginald John Kentish  Royal Irish Fusiliers
Lieutenant-Colonel George Despard Franks  19th Hussars
Lieutenant-Colonel Corlis St. Leger Gillman Hawkes  Royal Artillery
Lieutenant-Colonel Hugh John Bartholomew  Worcestershire Regiment
Lieutenant-Colonel Arthur Stedman Cotton  Royal Artillery
Lieutenant-Colonel Charles St. Maur Ingham  Royal Artillery
Lieutenant-Colonel Arthur Reginald, Wainewright  Royal Artillery
Lieutenant-Colonel William Herman Frank Weber  Royal Artillery
Lieutenant-Colonel Henry Valentine Bache de Satge  Royal Artillery
Lieutenant-Colonel Courtenay Russell Kelly  Royal Artillery
Major and Brevet Lieutenant-Colonel Bertie Drew Fisher  17th Lancers
Lieutenant-Colonel Charles Wallace Everett, Royal Army Ordnance Corps
Temp Lieutenant-Colonel Henry Percy Mayhury  Royal Engineers
Lieutenant-Colonel John Halket Crawford, 32nd Lancers, Indian Army
Lieutenant-Colonel William Stirling  Royal Artillery
Lieutenant-Colonel Lord Esmé Charles Gordon-Lennox  Scots Guards
Major and Brevet Lieutenant-Colonel Edmund Davidson, Royal Army Ordnance Corps
Major and Brevet Lieutenant-Colonel Hubert Conway Rees  Welsh Regiment
Major and Brevet Lieutenant-Colonel Rosslewin Westropp Morgan  South Staffordshire Regiment
Major and Brevet Lieutenant-Colonel Herbert Edmund Reginald Rubens Braine  Royal Munster Fusiliers
Major and Brevet Lieutenant-Colonel Kenneth Gray Buchanan  Seaforth Highlanders
Major and Brevet Lieutenant-Colonel William George Shedden Dobbie  Royal Engineers
Lieutenant-Colonel Maxton Moore  Royal Army Service Corps
Temp Lieutenant-Colonel Arthur Stephenson  Royal Scots
Temp Honorary Lieutenant-Colonel Hugh Cabot, Royal Army Medical Corps
Lieutenant-Colonel Harold Arthur David Richards  Royal Army Service Corps
Temp Lieutenant-Colonel Ewen Allan Cameron  North Lancashire Regiment, attd. East Surrey Regiment
Lieutenant-Colonel Francis Arthur Twiss  Royal Artillery
Lieutenant-Colonel Philip Joseph Paterson  Royal Artillery
Temp Lieutenant-Colonel Norman MacLeod  Cameron Highlanders
Lieutenant-Colonel William Mortimer Ogg  Royal Artillery
Major and Brevet Lieutenant-Colonel Robert Gilmour Earle  Royal Engineers
Major and Brevet Lieutenant-Colonel Paget Kernmis Betty  Royal Engineers
Major and Brevet Lieutenant-Colonel Claud Furniss Potter  Royal Artillery
Major and Brevet Lieutenant-Colonel Percy Hudson  Liverpool Regiment
Major and Brevet Lieutenant-Colonel Henry Townsend Corbet Singleton  Highland Light Infantry
Major and Brevet Lieutenant-Colonel George Charles Grazebrook  Royal Inniskilling Fusiliers
Major and Brevet Lieutenant-Colonel Walter Pitts Hendy Hill  Royal Fusiliers
Major and Brevet Lieutenant-Colonel Wilfrid Keith Evans  Manchester Regiment
Major and Brevet Lieutenant-Colonel Percy Ryan Conway Commings  South Staffordshire Regiment
Major and Brevet Lieutenant-Colonel Maurice Grove Taylor  Royal Engineers
Major and Brevet Lieutenant-Colonel Denis John Charles Kirwan Bernard  Rifle Brigade
Major and Brevet Lieutenant-Colonel Reginald Tilson Lee  Royal West Surrey Regiment
Major and Brevet Lieutenant-Colonel Horace Walter Cobham 
Lieutenant-Colonel Henry Ernest Singleton Wynne  Royal Artillery
Lieutenant-Colonel Arthur Maxwell  London Regiment
Lieutenant-Colonel William Melvill Warburton  Royal Artillery
Temp Lieutenant-Colonel John Espenett Knott  Royal Inniskilling Fusiliers
Lieutenant-Colonel Cecil Henry Pank  8th Battalion, Middlesex Regiment
Lieutenant-Colonel Austin Thorp  Royal Artillery (to date 29 October 1918.)
Temp Lieutenant-Colonel George Henry Gater  Nottinghamshire and Derbyshire Regiment
Temp Lieutenant-Colonel Edward Allen Wood  General List
Lieutenant-Colonel John Beaumont Neilson  5th Battalion, Highland Light Infantry
Lieutenant-Colonel James Archibald Charteris Forsyth  Royal Artillery
Major and Brevet Lieutenant-Colonel James Hubert Thomas Cornish-Bowden  Duke of Cornwall's Light Infantry
Major and Brevet Lieutenant-Colonel Thomas Rose-Caradoc Price  Welsh Guards
Major and Brevet Lieutenant-Colonel James Glendinning Browne  Royal Army Service Corps
Major and Brevet Lieutenant-Colonel Herbert Tregosse Gwennap Moore  Royal Engineers
Major and Brevet Lieutenant-Colonel Horace Somerville Sewell  4th Dragoon Guards
Major and Brevet Lieutenant-Colonel William Henry Traill  East Lancashire Regiment
Major and Brevet Lieutenant-Colonel Charles William Macleod  Royal Army Service Corps
Major and Brevet Lieutenant-Colonel Charles Bertie Owen Symons  Royal Engineers
Major and Brevet Lieutenant-Colonel Reginald Francis Amhurst Butterworth  Royal Engineers
Major and Brevet Lieutenant-Colonel Reginald Joseph Slaughter  Royal Army Service Corps
Major and Brevet Lieutenant-Colonel Henry Charles Simpson  Royal Artillery
Major and Brevet Lieutenant-Colonel George Francis Bennett Goldney  Royal Engineers
Major and Brevet Lieutenant-Colonel Bertram Norman Sergison-Brooke  Grenadier Guards
Major and Brevet Lieutenant-Colonel George de Someri Dudley, Royal Army Ordnance Corps
Major and Brevet Lieutenant-Colonel Percy Wilson-Brown  Gordon Highlanders
Major and Brevet Lieutenant-Colonel Thomas Thackeray Grove  Royal Engineers
Major and Brevet Lieutenant-Colonel Schomberg Henley Eden  Royal Highlanders
Major and Brevet Lieutenant-Colonel Guy Charles Williams  Royal Engineers
Major and Brevet Lieutenant-Colonel John McDougall Haskard  Royal Dublin Fusiliers
Major and Brevet Lieutenant-Colonel JosephRobert Wethered  Gloucestershire Regiment
Major and Brevet Lieutenant-Colonel Austin Claude Girdwood  Northumberland Fusiliers
Major and Brevet Lieutenant-Colonel Ronald Macclesfield Heath  Middlesex Regiment
Major and Brevet Lieutenant-Colonel Edward Pius Arthur Riddell  Rifle Brigade
Major and Brevet Lieutenant-Colonel James Lauderdale Gilbert Burnett  Gordon Highlanders
Major and Brevet Lieutenant-Colonel Frank Godfrey Willan  King's Royal Rifle Corps
Major and Brevet Lieutenant-Colonel Arthur Cecil Temperley  Norfolk Regiment
Major and Brevet Lieutenant-Colonel Stuart Harman Joseph Thunder  Norton Regiment
Major and Brevet Lieutenant-Colonel Hugh Marjoribanks Craigie Halkett  Highland Light Infantry
Major and Brevet Lieutenant-Colonel Roland Luker  Lancashire Fusiliers
Major and Brevet Lieutenant-Colonel Adrian Beare Incledon-Webber  Royal Irish Fusiliers
Major and Brevet Lieutenant-Colonel William Denman Croft  Scottish Rifles
Major and Brevet Lieutenant-Colonel Francis Cecil Longbourne  Royal West Surrey Regiment
Major and Brevet Lieutenant-Colonel Robert Francis Hurter Wallace, Royal Highlanders
Temp Major and Brevet Lieutenant-Colonel Geoffrey Llewellyn Hinds Hpwell, Royal Army Service Corps
Major and Brevet Lieutenant-Colonel Humphry Waugh Snow  Reserve of Officers, Royal West Kent Regiment
Temp Lieutenant-Colonel William George Astell Ramsey-Fairfax  Tank Corps
Lieutenant-Colonel Francis Leger Christian Livingstone-Learmonth, Royal Artillery (employed Royal Artillery)
Lieutenant-Colonel Walliam Reid Glover  London Regiment
Lieutenant-Colonel Edmund Farquhar St. John  Royal Artillery
Temp Lieutenant-Colonel Cyril Montagu Luck  Royal Engineers
Lieutenant-Colonel Edward James, Earl of Elgin and Kincardine, Royal Artillery
Major Francis Fane Lambarde 
Major Harold Charles Thoroton Hildyard 
Major Harry Romer Lee 
Major George Stuart Knox, Royal Engineers
Major William Kelson Russell  Royal Engineers
Lieutenant-Colonel Lancelot Richmond Beadon  Royal Army Service Corps
Major Gilbert Claud Hamilton  Grenadier Guards
Major Mervyn Meares  Royal Army Ordnance Corps
Major Henry Alexander Boyd  Royal Artillery
Temp Major Hubert StanleyWhitmore Pennington  Royal Army Service Corps
Major William Murray Stewart  Cameron Highlanders
Temp Major William Belfield, Royal Army Service Corps
Major John Poole Bowring Robinson  Royal Dublin Fusiliers
Major Rupert Caesar Smythe  Royal Inniskilling Fusiliers, attd. Royal Irish Rifles
Major Lancelot Edward Seth Ward  Royal Artillery, Oxfordshire & Buckinghamshire Light Infantry
Major Frederick George Skipwith, Labour Corps
Temp Major Joseph Dalrymple  Royal Army Medical Corps
Temp Major William Alfred Greenley  Royal Army Service Corps
Major Duncan Grant-Dalton  West Yorkshire Regiment, employed 19th Battalion, Welsh Regiment
Major John Inglis, Highland Light Infantry, employed Cameron Highlanders
Major Alan Hamer Maude  Royal Army Service Corps
Major Lawrence Chenevix-Trench  Royal Engineers
Major Leopold Christian Duncan Jenner 
Temp Major James Aubrey Smith, General List, employed Labour Corps
Captain Hubert Conrad Sparks  London Regiment
Captain and Brevet Major Edward Cuthbert de Renzy Martin  Yorkshire Light Infantry, attd. 11th Battalion, Lancashire Fusiliers
Captain and Brevet Major William Henry Annesley 

Canadian Force
Brigadier-General Charles Johnstone Armstrong  Canadian Engineers
Brigadier-General Hugh Marshall Dyer  Saskatchewan Regiment, Canadian Infantry
Brigadier-General William Antrobus Griesbach  Alberta Regiment, Canadian Infantry
Brigadier-General Frederick William Hill  West Ontario Regiment Canadian Infantry
Brigadier-General James Howden MacBrien  Royal Canadian Dragoons
Brigadier-General Henri Alexandre Panet  Royal Canadian Horse Artillery
Brigadier-General John William Stewart  Canadian Railway Troops
Brigadier-General John Munro Ross  British Columbia Regiment
Brigadier-General Dennis Colburn Draper  Quebec Regiment
Brigadier-General Daniel Mowat Ormond  Alberta Regiment
Brigadier-General John Smith Stewart  Canadian Field Artillery
Brigadier-General Alexander Ross  Saskatchewan Regiment
Colonel Robert Percy Wright  Canadian Army Medical Corps
Colonel Alexander MacPhail  Royal Canadian Engineers
Major and Brevet Lieutenant-Colonel William Beaumont Anderson  Royal Canadian Engineers
Lieutenant-Colonel Herbert John Dawson  Saskatchewan Regiment
Lieutenant-Colonel Archibald de Mowbray Bell, Canadian Army Service Corps
Lieutenant-Colonel Spurgeon Campbell, Canadian Army Medical Corps
Lieutenant-Colonel William Robert Bertram  Manitoba Regiment
Lieutenant-Colonel Stratton Harry Osier  Royal Canadian Engineers
Lieutenant-Colonel Johnson Lindsey Rowlett Parsons  Saskatchewan Regiment
Major Kenric Rud Marshall  Central Ontario Regiment
Lieutenant-Colonel John Franklin Kidd, Canadian Army Medical Corps

Australian Force
Colonel Julius Henry Bruche  General List, Australian Imperial Force
Colonel Walter Ramsay McNicoll  General List, Australian Imperial Force
Colonel Walter Adams Coxen  General List, Australian Imperial Force
Colonel Cecil Henry Foott  General List, Australian Imperial Force

For valuable services rendered in connection with Military Operations in Egypt:
Lieutenant-Colonel and Brevet Colonel Robert Seymour Vandeleur  Seaforth Highlanders
Lieutenant-Colonel and Brevet Colonel Edmund Merritt Morris  Royal Lancaster Regiment
Lieutenant-Colonel Arthur Henry Orlando Lloyd  Shropshire Yeomanry
Temp Lieutenant-Colonel Herbert Lightfoot Eason  Royal Army Medical Corps
Major Charles Philip Scudamore  late Royal Scots Fusiliers

For valuable services rendered in connection with Military Operations in Italy:
Colonel Thomas Roe Christopher Hudson, Royal Artillery
Lieutenant-Colonel and Brevet Colonel Herbert Gordon  Leicestershire Regiment
Major and Brevet Colonel Henry Lethbridge Alexander  Dorsetshire Regiment
Lieutenant-Colonel and Brevet Colonel John Arkwright Strick  Shropshire Light Infantry

For valuable services rendered in connection with Military Operations in Salonika:
Lieutenant-Colonel and Brevet-Colonel Robert Hugh Hare  Royal Artillery
Lieutenant-Colonel and Brevet, Colonel Henry Edward Theodore Kelly  Royal Artillery
Colonel Fitzpatrick Eassie  Royal Army Veterinary Corps
Temp Colonel Arthur George Phear 
Major and Brevet Lieutenant-Colonel Francis Stewart Montague-Bates  East Surrey Regiment
Captain and Brevet Major Robert Ernest Kelly, Royal Army Medical Corps

For valuable services rendered in connection with Military Operations in North Russia:
Major and Brevet Lieutenant-Colonel Charles Clarkson Martin Maynard  Devonshire Regiment

Royal Air Force
Major-General Edward Leonard Ellington 
Major-General William Geoffrey Hanson Salmond 
Major-General Richard Cleveland Munday 
Colonel Philip Woolcott Game 
Colonel Oliver Swann
Colonel Francis Rowland Scarlett 
Colonel Lionel Evelyn Oswald Charlton  
Lieutenant-Colonel John Glanville Hearson

Civil Division 
Rear-Admiral Arthur David Ricardo
Rear-Admiral Robert John Prendergast
Engineer Rear-Admiral William George Mogg
Engineer Rear-Admiral George William Hudson
Captain Ronald Arthur Hopwood  
Captain Wentworth Henry Davies Margesson  
Captain Alexander Lowndes  
Lieutenant-Colonel Charles Louis Brooke, Royal Marine Artillery
Engineer Captain John Harry Jenkin  
Engineer Captain John McLaurin  
Surgeon-Captain Walter Godfrey Axford  
Surgeon-Captain Arthur Stanley Nance  
Paymaster Commander Graham Hewlett  
Paymaster Commander Alfred Ramsey Parker  
Paymaster Commander Philip John Hawkins Lander Row  
Paymaster Commander Henry Wilfred Eldon Manisty 
Paymaster Commander Ernest Walsham Charles Thring  
Major and Brevet Colonel Richard ffolliott Willis, Royal Marine Light Infantry
Lieutenant-Colonel and Brevet-Colonel George Frend, Commanding 3rd Battalion (Reserve), The Prince of Wales's Own (West Yorkshire Regiment)
Colonel William Alexander Mellis  Chairman, Aberdeenshire Territorial Force Association
Colonel Sir Francis Douglas Blake  Vice-Chairman, Northumberland Territorial Force Association
Colonel Robert Oliver Lloyd  Chairman, Pembrokeshire Territorial Force Association
Major Henry Reeves Parkes, Unattached Last, Territorial Force, Secretary, West Lancashire Territorial Force Association
Colonel Sir Thomas Henry, Marquess of Bath  HM Lieutenant for the County of Somerset, President, Somersetshire Territorial Force Association
Major Frederick William Peacock  Chairman, Derbyshire Territorial Force Association
Edward Hall Alderson, Clerk Assistant at the Table, House of Lords
Cyril Ernest Ashford, Headmaster, Royal Naval College, Dartmouth, also Adviser on Education to the Admiralty
Percy Walter Llewellyn Ashley, Assistant Secretary (Department of Industries and Manufactures), Board of Trade
Robert Reid Bannatyne, Assistant Secretary, Home Office 
Wilberforce Ross Barker, Assistant Secretary, Board of Education
Edmund Bourke, Commissioner, Irish Local Government Board
Harold Edward Dale, Assistant Secretary, Board of Agriculture
John Colin Campbell Davidson, Private Secretary to the Chancellor of the Exchequer
Edmund Alderson Sandford Fawcett, Secretary, Ministry of National Service
Michael Heseltine, Assistant Secretary, Ministry of Reconstruction
Richard Valentine Nind Hopkins, Commissioner and Secretary, Inland Revenue
Charles Fraser Adair Hore, Assistant Secretary, Ministry of Munitions
Andrew Philip Magill, Registrar of Petty Sessions Clerks, Ireland. Lately Private Secretary to Irish Office
Ernest Grant Moggridge, Assistant Secretary (Railway Department), Board of Trade
The Honourable Frank Trevor Bigham, Assistant Commissioner, New Scotland Yard
William Archdale Bland, Principal Clerk, War Office, lent to Air Ministry as Assistant Financial Secretary
Lawrence George Brock, Assistant Secretary, National Health Insurance Commission
Harold Beresford Butler, Assistant Secretary, Ministry of Labour
Frank Herbert Coller, Assistant Secretary, Ministry of Food
Brigadier-General Archibald Samuel Cooper  Director of Inland Waterways and Docks
George Herbert Duckworth, Ministry of Munitions
Captain The Honourable Evelyn FitzGerald, Private Secretary to the Quartermaster-General, War Office
Ernest Julian Foley, Director of Military Sea Transport, Admiralty
Captain Clement Jones, Assistant Secretary, War Cabinet
Cecil Hermann Kisch, Private Secretary to the Secretary of State, India Office
Robert Bruce Low  Assistant Medical Officer, Local Government Board (retired)
The Honourable Francis Oswald Lindley  Counsellor to His Britannic Majesty's Embassy, Petrograd
Frederick Henry McLeod, Commissioner of Trade Exemptions, Ministry of National Service
Alexander William Monro, Private Secretary to the President, Board of Agriculture and Fisheries
Francis Hamer Oates, Private Secretary to the President, Board of Education
Henry Howard Piggott  Assistant Secretary, Ministry of Munitions
Edward Raven, Assistant Secretary, General Post Office
John Lindsay Robertson  Senior Chief Inspector of Schools, Scotland
Lieutenant-Colonel Lancelot Starr, Assistant Secretary, War Cabinet
Philip George Lancelot Webb, Deputy Controller, Petrol Control Department
Victor Alexander Augustus Henry Wellesley, Controller of Commercial and Consular Service, Foreign Office
Edward Frank Wise, Assistant Secretary, Ministry of Food

The Most Exalted Order of the Star of India

Knight Commander (KCSI) 
Oswald Vivian Bosanquet  Indian Civil Service, Agent to the Governor-General in Central India

Companion (CSI) 
Hugh McPherson, Indian Civil Service, Chief Secretary to the Government of Bihar and Orissa
Henry Fraser Howard  Indian Civil Service, Secretary to the Government of India, Finance Department
Heniy Hubert Hayden  Director, Geological Survey of India
Lieutenant-Colonel Herbert Des Voeux. Inspector-General of Police, Burma

The Most Distinguished Order of Saint Michael and Saint George

Knight Grand Cross of the Order of St Michael and St George (GCMG) 
Vice-Admiral The Honourable Sir Somerset Arthur Gough-Calthorpe 
Vice-Admiral Sir Montague Edward Browning 
Vice-Admiral Sir John Michael de Robeck 

Canadian Forces
Lieutenant-General Sir Arthur William Currie 

Australian Forces
Major-General Sir John Monash

Knight Commander of the Order of St Michael and St George (KCMG) 
Colonel Charles Delme-Radcliffe 
Major-General George Tom Molesworth Bridges  
Major-General William Watson Pike  Army Medical Service
Temp Colonel John Atkins  Army Medical Service
Major-General Gerald Francis Ellison 
Major-General Herbert Francis, Lord Cheylesmore 
Major-General Frederick William Bainbridge Landon 
Major-General Robert Arundel Kerr Montgomery 
Major-General Henry Ernest Stanton 
Robert Thorne Coryndon  Governor and Commander-in-Chief of the Uganda Protectorate
The Right Honourable William Frederick Lloyd  Prime Minister of Newfoundland
The Honourable Henry Bruce Lefroy  Premier of the State of Western Australia
Henry Charles Miller Lambert  Assistant Under Secretary of State for the Colonies, and Secretary to the Imperial Conference
Francis James Newton  Treasurer of Southern Rhodesia
Percy Charles Hugh Wyndham, His Majesty's Envoy Extraordinary and Minister Plenipotentiary to the Republic of Colombia
Sir Francis Oppenheimer  Commercial Attaché and Acting Counsellor of Embassy in His Majesty's Diplomatic Service
Harry Harling Lamb  Consul-General in His Majesty's Consular Service in the Levant
Vice-Admiral Sir Hugh Evan-Thomas 
Vice-Admiral Sir William Christopher Pakenham 
Rear-Admiral Francis Fitzgerald Haworth-Booth 
Rear-Admiral Allan Frederic Everett  
Engineer Rear-Admiral Henry Humphreys 
Surgeon Rear-Admiral George Welch 
Major-General John Frederic Daniell  Royal Marine Light Infantry

Australian Forces
Major-General Cyril Brudenell Bingham White 
Major-General Sir Joseph John Talbot Hobbs 

For services rendered in connection with Military Operations in Egypt:
Major-General John Stuart Mackenzie Shea  
General Sydenham Campbell Urquhart Smith 

For valuable services rendered in connection with Military Operations in Salonika:
Colonel Henry Joseph Everett 
Lieutenant-General Sir George Francis Milne

Companion of the Order of St Michael and St George (CMG) 
Colonel George Frederick Colin Campbell  Secretary to the Treasury, Receiver-General and Paymaster-General, Dominion of New Zealand
Claude Ambrose Cardew, District Resident, First Grade, Nyasaland Protectorate
Leslie Couper, Member of the West African Currency Board
John James Dent, Member of the Committee of Management of the Emigrants Information Office
James Fraser  Chief Commissioner for Railways and Tramways, State of New South Wales
William Frederick Gowers, Resident of Kano, Nigeria
Wilfrid Edward Francis Jackson, Colonial Secretary of the Bermudas or Homers Islands
Merton King, Resident Commissioner, The New Hebrides
William Russell Morris  Secretary, Post and Telegraph Department, Dominion of New Zealand
Aylmer Cavendish Pearson, Governor of the State of North Borneo
William Charles Fleming Robertson, Colonial Secretary of Gibraltar, and Acting Lieutenant-Governor and Chief Secretary to Government, Malta
Frank Tate  Director of Education in the State of Victoria
Henry Arthur Cooke, Commercial Attaché in His Majesty's Diplomatic Service
Alexander Telford Waugh, Commercial Attaché to His Majesty's Legation at Athens and Consul in His Majesty's Consular Service in the Levant
John Thomas Pratt, His Majesty's Consul at Tsinan, China
Rear-Admiral Cecil Frederick Dampier
Lieutenant-Colonel and Brevet Colonel St. George Bewes Armstrong, Royal Marine Light Infantry
Captain Alexander Farrington
Captain Montagu William Warcop Peter Consett
Captain Cecil Maxwell-Lefroy
Captain Arthur Kenneth Macrorie 
Captain Charles William Bruton
Captain Alldin Usborne Moore
Captain Arthur Edmund Wood
Captain Lockhart Leith 
Captain Gilbert Owen Stephenson
Captain John Lewis Pearson
Captain Wilfred Franklin French
Commander Sidney Richard Olivier
Acting Captain Henry Albert le Fowne Hurt
Engineer Captain Sydney Rider
Lieutenant-Colonel Picton Phillipps  Royal Marine Artillery
Engineer Commander Richard Barns Morison
Commander Edward James Headlam 
Engineer Commander Horace George Summerford
Engineer Commander Arthur Edward Hyne
Surgeon Commander Robert Dundonald Jameson
Surgeon Commander Hugh Somerville Burniston 
Acting Paymaster Commander John Cogswell Boardman
Major Arthur Peel, Royal Marine Light Infantry
Major-General Richard Bannatine-Allason  
Major-General Herman James Shelley Landon  
Colonel Thomas Stock, late Essex Regiment
Lieutenant-Colonel and Brevet Colonel Arthur Robert Austen, late Shropshire Light Infantry
Colonel Robert Scott-Kerr 
Colonel Edward Agar, late Royal Engineers
Colonel Sydney Charles Fishburn Jackson  late Hampshire Regiment
Colonel Lionel Dorling  Army Pay Department
Colonel Reginald Stewart Oxley  
Colonel James Aubrey Gibbon
Colonel Donald Guy Prendergast
Colonel Hugh Duncan Lawrence 
Colonel Anthony Hudson Woodifield  Royal Army Ordnance Corps
Lieutenant-Colonel and Brevet Colonel Alan Hinde, Royal Artillery
Lieutenant-Colonel and Brevet Colonel Robert William Hare  Norfolk Regiment
Lieutenant-Colonel and Brevet Colonel Lancelot Machell Wilson  Royal Artillery
Lieutenant-Colonel and Brevet Colonel Ralph Henry Carr-Ellison, late 1st Dragoons
Major and Brevet Colonel Richard Alexander Steel  Indian Army
Lieutenant-Colonel Edward St. Aubyn Wake, late Indian Army
Lieutenant-Colonel The Honourable Walter Dashwood Sclater-Booth  
Lieutenant-Colonel Lewis Iggulden Backhouse Hulke, East Kent Regiment
Lieutenant-Colonel Robert John Byford Mair, Royal Engineers
Lieutenant-Colonel Reginald George Munn, 36th Sikhs, Indian Army
Major and Brevet Lieutenant-Colonel William Samuel Anthony, Royal Army Veterinary Corps
Major and Brevet Lieutenant-Colonel Oswald Kesteven Chance  5th Lancers
Major and Brevet Lieutenant-Colonel Herbert Watkins Grubb  Border Regiment
Lieutenant-Colonel Gerald Richard Vivian Kinsman  Royal Artillery
Major and Brevet Lieutenant-Colonel George Alfred Travels, late Royal Engineers
Major and Brevet Lieutenant-Colonel Julian Lawrence Fisher  Royal Fusiliers
Major and Brevet Lieutenant-Colonel Eric Edward Boketon Holt-Wilson  late Royal Engineers
Major and Brevet Lieutenant-Colonel Edmund Byam Mathew-Lannowe  Royal West Surrey Regiment
Major and Brevet Lieutenant-Colonel Llewelyn Evans  Royal Engineers
Major and Brevet Lieutenant-Colonel Wilfrid Wykeham Jelf  Royal Artillery
Major and Brevet Lieutenant-Colonel Josslyn Vere Ramsden  Royal Artillery
Major and Brevet Lieutenant-Colonel John James Aitkin  Royal Army Veterinary Corps
Major and Brevet Lieutenant-Colonel Ernest Hewlett  Devonshire Regiment
Major and Brevet Lieutenant-Colonel The Honourable Maurice Charles Andrew Drummond  Royal Highlanders
Major Algernon Forbes Randolph  late Middlesex Regiment
Major Gerald Walton Hobson  late 12th Lancers
Major Ion Richard Staveley Shinkwin  Royal Army Service Corps
Major Thomas Bernard Arthur Leahy, Royal Army Ordnance Corps
Major Herbert Laurence Wethered  Royal Army Ordnance Corps
Temp Major Arthur Tilson Shaen Magan, Royal Army Service Corps
Captain and Brevet Major Alfred Searle Head  Royal Army Veterinary Corps
Major Charles Edward Willes, 3rd (R.) Battalion, Royal Welsh Fusiliers
Temp Major Vere Brabazon Ponsonby, Viscount Duncannon
Colonel Edward Maitland Maitland 
Colonel Harold Douglas Briggs
Colonel The Honourable Arthur Stopford
Colonel Rudolph Edward Trower Hogg 
Colonel Hugh Caswall Tremenheere Dowding
Colonel Eugene Louis Gerrard 
Lieutenant-Colonel Thomas Charles Reginald Higgins
Lieutenant-Colonel Philip Lee William Herbert
Lieutenant-Colonel Cyril Louis Norton Newall
Lieutenant-Colonel Robert Gordon 
Lieutenant-Colonel Bertie Harold Olivier Armstrong
Lieutenant-Colonel Andrew George Board 
Lieutenant-Colonel Felton Vesey Holt 
Lieutenant-Colonel Kennedy Gerard Brooke
Lieutenant-Colonel Philip Bennet Joubert de la Ferté 
Lieutenant-Colonel Norman Duckworth Kerr MacEwen 
Lieutenant-Colonel Gerard Robert Addison Holmes 
Lieutenant-Colonel Percival Kinnear Wise 
Lieutenant-Colonel Archibald Christie 
Lieutenant-Colonel Arthur Wellesley Bigsworth 
Lieutenant-Colonel Evelyn Boscawen Gordon 
Lieutenant-Colonel Reginald John Armes
Lieutenant-Colonel Ivo Arthur Exley Edwards
Lieutenant-Colonel Hugh Alexander Williamson
Lieutenant-Colonel Arthur Lowthian Godman 
Lieutenant-Colonel Arthur Vere Bettington
Lieutenant-Colonel Bertram Charles Fellows
Lieutenant-Colonel Geoffrey Teale Brierley 
Lieutenant-Colonel Malcolm Graham Christie 
Lieutenant-Colonel Tom Dark Mackie 
Canadian Forces
Colonel Hugh A. Chisholm, Canadian Army Medical Corps
Lieutenant-Colonel William Amor Simson  Canadian Army Service Corps
Lieutenant-Colonel Alfred Cecil Critchley  Canadian Cavalry
Lieutenant-Colonel Karl Creighton Folger  Canadian Ordnance Corps
Australian Forces
Colonel Herbert Brayley Collett  General List, Australian Imperial Force
Colonel William Walter Russell Watson, General List, Australian Imperial Force
Temp Colonel Charles Snodgrass Ryan, Australian Army Medical Corps
Lieutenant-Colonel Frank Marshall, Australian Army Medical Corps
New Zealand Force
Colonel Eugene Joseph O'Neill  New Zealand Medical Corps

For services rendered in connection with military operations in France and Flanders:
Major-General Reginald Ulick Henry Buckland  
Major-General Richard Philips Lee  
Major-General John Moore  
Colonel Reginald Hoare 
Colonel and Honorary Brigadier-General Richard Charles Bernard Lawrence  
Colonel and Honorary Major-General John Elford Dickie  India
Colonel and Honorary Brigadier-General James Evans
Colonel John Vaughan  
Colonel Charles William Brownlow 
Lieutenant-Colonel and Brevet Colonel Richard Pigot Molesworth, Royal Artillery
Colonel Arthur Ernest John Perkins  
Lieutenant-Colonel and Brevet Colonel Hugh Maude de Fellenberg Montgomery  Royal Artillery
Lieutenant-Colonel and Brevet Colonel Torquhil George Matheson  Coldstream Guards
Major and Brevet Colonel John Charteris  Royal Engineers
Major and Brevet Colonel James Kilvington Cochrane, Leinster Regiment
Major and Brevet Colonel Lewis Frederic Green-Wilkinson 
Colonel Arthur Malcolm Tyler 
Temp Colonel George Ernest Gask  Army Medical Service
Temp Colonel Edwin Greenwood Hardy, Remount Service
Colonel John Poe  Army Medical Service
Major and Brevet Colonel Cyril Norman MacMullen  15th Sikhs, Indian Army
Major and Brevet Colonel Ian Stewart  Scottish Rifles
Rev. James Henry Davey, Royal Army Chaplains' Department
Temp Colonel John Alexander Nixon  Army Medical Service
Temp Colonel William Errington Hume  Army Medical Service
Lieutenant-Colonel and Brevet Colonel Claud Edward Charles Graham Charlton  Royal Artillery
Lieutenant-Colonel and Brevet Colonel Leopold Charles Louis Oldfield  Royal Artillery
Lieutenant-Colonel and Brevet Colonel Roger Henry Massie, Royal Artillery
Lieutenant-Colonel and Brevet Colonel Henry William Newcombe  Royal Artillery
Major and Brevet Colonel Spencer Edmund Hollond  Rifle Brigade
Lieutenant-Colonel and Brevet Colonel Clive Gordon Pritchard  Royal Artillery
Major and Brevet Colonel Ryves Alexander Mark Currie  Somerset Light Infantry
Lieutenant-Colonel William Kitson Clayton  Royal Army Medical Corps
Lieutenant-Colonel Netterville Guy Barron  Royal Artillery
Lieutenant-Colonel William Legh Palmer, Royal Engineers
Lieutenant-Colonel Durie Parsons  Royal Army Service Corps
Lieutenant-Colonel D'Arcy Legard  17th Lancers
Lieutenant-Colonel Alexander James MacDougall  Royal Army Medical Corps
Lieutenant-Colonel Henry Graham Martin, Royal Army Medical Corps
Lieutenant-Colonel Standish de Courcy O'Grady  Royal Army Medical Corps
Lieutenant-Colonel Henry Herrick  Royal Army Medical Corps
Lieutenant-Colonel Horace Samson Roch  Royal Army Medical Corps
Lieutenant-Colonel Allen Butler Gosset, Cheshire Regiment
Lieutenant-Colonel Ronald Marr Johnson  Royal Artillery
Lieutenant-Colonel William Loring  Royal Garrison Artillery
Lieutenant-Colonel Geoffrey Nowell Salmon  Rifle Brigade
Lieutenant-Colonel William George Thompson  Royal Artillery
Lieutenant-Colonel George Tagore Mair  Royal Artillery
Major and Brevet Lieutenant-Colonel Harry Biddulph  Royal Engineers
Major and Brevet Lieutenant-Colonel Anthony Julian Reddie  South Wales Borderers
Major and Brevet Lieutenant-Colonel Hector Gowans Reid  Royal Army Service Corps
Major and Brevet Lieutenant-Colonel Reginald John Kentish  Royal Irish Fusiliers
Lieutenant-Colonel George Despard Franks  19th Hussars
Lieutenant-Colonel Corlis St. Leger Gillman Hawkes  Royal Artillery
Lieutenant-Colonel Hugh John Bartholomew  Worcestershire Regiment
Lieutenant-Colonel Arthur Stedman Cotton  Royal Artillery
Lieutenant-Colonel Charles St. Maur Ingham  Royal Artillery
Lieutenant-Colonel Arthur Reginald Wainewright  Royal Artillery
Lieutenant-Colonel William Herman Frank Weber  Royal Artillery
Lieutenant-Colonel Henry Valentine Bache de Satgé  Royal Artillery
Lieutenant-Colonel Courtenay Russell Kelly  Royal Artillery
Major and Brevet Lieutenant-Colonel Bertie Drew Fisher  17th Lancers
Lieutenant-Colonel Charles Wallace Everett, Royal Army Ordnance Corps
Temp Lieutenant-Colonel Henry Maybury  Royal Engineers
Lieutenant-Colonel John Halket Crawford, 32nd Lancers, Indian Army
Lieutenant-Colonel William Stirling  Royal Artillery
Lieutenant-Colonel Lord Esmé Charles Gordon-Lennox  Scots Guards
Major and Brevet Lieutenant-Colonel Edmund Davidson, Royal Army Ordnance Corps
Major and Brevet Lieutenant-Colonel Hubert Conway Rees  Welsh Regiment
Major and Brevet Lieutenant-Colonel Rosslewin Westropp Morgan  South Staffordshire Regiment
Major and Brevet Lieutenant-Colonel Herbert Edmund Reginald Rubens Braine  Royal Munster Fusiliers
Major and Brevet Lieutenant-Colonel Kenneth Gray Buchanan  Seaforth Highlanders
Major and Brevet Lieutenant-Colonel William George Shedden Dobbie  Royal Engineers
Lieutenant-Colonel Maxton Moore  Royal Army Service Corps
Temp Lieutenant-Colonel Arthur Stephenson  Royal Scots
Temp Honorary Lieutenant-Colonel Hugh Cabot, Royal Army Medical Corps
Lieutenant-Colonel Harold Arthur David Richards  Royal Army Service Corps
Temp Lieutenant-Colonel Ewen Allan Cameron  North Lancashire Regiment, attd. East Surrey Regiment
Lieutenant-Colonel Francis Arthur Twiss  Royal Artillery
Lieutenant-Colonel Philip Joseph Paterson  Royal Artillery
Temp Lieutenant-Colonel Norman MacLeod  Cameron Highlanders
Lieutenant-Colonel William Mortimer Ogg  Royal Artillery
Major and Brevet Lieutenant-Colonel Robert Gilmour Earle  Royal Engineers
Major and Brevet Lieutenant-Colonel Paget Kemmis Betty  Royal Engineers
Major and Brevet Lieutenant-Colonel Claud Furniss Potter  Royal Artillery
Major and Brevet Lieutenant-Colonel Percy Hudson  Liverpool Regiment
Major and Brevet Lieutenant-Colonel Henry Townsend Corbet Singleton  Highland Light Infantry
Major and Brevet Lieutenant-Colonel George Charles Grazebrook  Royal Inniskilling Fusiliers
Major and Brevet Lieutenant-Colonel Walter Pitts Hendy Hill  Royal Fusiliers
Major and Brevet Lieutenant-Colonel Wilfred Keith Evans  Manchester Regiment
Major and Brevet Lieutenant-Colonel Percy Ryan Conway Commings  South Staffordshire Regiment
Major and Brevet Lieutenant-Colonel Maurice Grove Taylor  Royal Engineers
Major and Brevet Lieutenant-Colonel Denis John Charles Kirwan Bernard  Rifle Brigade
Major and Brevet Lieutenant-Colonel Reginald Tilson Lee  Royal West Surrey Regiment
Major and Brevet Lieutenant-Colonel Horace Walter Cobham 
Lieutenant-Colonel Henry Ernest Singleton Wynne  Royal Artillery
Lieutenant-Colonel Arthur Maxwell  London Regiment
Lieutenant-Colonel William Melvill Warburton  Royal Artillery
Temp Lieutenant-Colonel John Espenett Knott  Royal Inniskilling Fusiliers
Lieutenant-Colonel Cecil Henry Pank  8th Battalion, Middlesex Regiment
Lieutenant-Colonel Austin Thorp  Royal Artillery (to date 29 October 1918.)
Temp Lieutenant-Colonel George Henry Gater  Nottinghamshire and Derbyshire Regiment
Temp Lieutenant-Colonel Edward Allan Wood  General List
Lieutenant-Colonel John Beaumont Neilson  5th Battalion, Highland Light Infantry
Lieutenant-Colonel James Archibald Charteris Forsyth  Royal Artillery
Major and Brevet Lieutenant-Colonel James Hubert Thomas Cornish-Bowden  Duke of Cornwall's Light Infantry
Major and Brevet Lieutenant-Colonel Thomas Rose Caradoc Price  Welsh Guards
Major and Brevet Lieutenant-Colonel James Glendinning Browne  Royal Army Service Corps
Major and Brevet Lieutenant-Colonel Herbert Tregosse Gwennap Moore  Royal Engineers
Major and Brevet Lieutenant-Colonel Horace Somerville Sewell  4th Dragoon Guards
Major and Brevet Lieutenant-Colonel William Henry Traill  East Lancashire Regiment
Major and Brevet Lieutenant-Colonel Charles William Macleod  Royal Army Service Corps
Major and Brevet Lieutenant-Colonel Charles Bertie Owen Symons  Royal Engineers
Major and Brevet Lieutenant-Colonel Reginald Francis Amhurst Butterworth  Royal Engineers
Major and Brevet Lieutenant-Colonel Reginald Joseph Slaughter  Royal Army Service Corps
Major and Brevet Lieutenant-Colonel Henry Charles Simpson  Royal Artillery
Major and Brevet Lieutenant-Colonel George Francis Bennett Goldney  Royal Engineers
Major and Brevet Lieutenant-Colonel Bertram Norman Sergison-Brooke  Grenadier Guards
Major and Brevet Lieutenant-Colonel George de Someri Dudley, Royal Army Ordnance Corps
Major and Brevet Lieutenant-Colonel Percy Wilson Brown  Gordon Highlanders
Major and Brevet Lieutenant-Colonel Thomas Thackeray Grove  Royal Engineers
Major and Brevet Lieutenant-Colonel Schomberg Henley Eden  Royal Highlanders
Major and Brevet Lieutenant-Colonel Guy Charles Williams  Royal Engineers
Major and Brevet Lieutenant-Colonel John McDougall Haskard  Royal Dublin Fusiliers
Major and Brevet Lieutenant-Colonel Joseph Robert Wethered  Gloucestershire Regiment
Major and Brevet Lieutenant-Colonel Austin Claude Girdwood  Northumberland Fusiliers
Major and Brevet Lieutenant-Colonel Ronald Macclesfield Heath  Middlesex Regiment
Major and Brevet Lieutenant-Colonel Edward Pius Arthur Riddell  Rifle Brigade
Major and Brevet Lieutenant-Colonel James Lauderdale Gilbert Burnett  Gordon Highlanders
Major and Brevet Lieutenant-Colonel Frank Godfrey Willan  King's Royal Rifle Corps
Major and Brevet Lieutenant-Colonel Arthur Cecil Temperley  Norfolk Regiment
Major and Brevet Lieutenant-Colonel Stuart Harman Joseph Thunder  Norton Regiment
Major and Brevet Lieutenant-Colonel Hugh Marjoribanks Craigie Halkett  Highland Light Infantry
Major and Brevet Lieutenant-Colonel Roland Luker  Lancashire Fusiliers
Major and Brevet Lieutenant-Colonel Adrian Beare Incledon-Webber  Royal Irish Fusiliers
Major and Brevet Lieutenant-Colonel William Denman Croft  Scottish Rifles
Major and Brevet Lieutenant-Colonel Francis Cecil Longbourne  Royal West Surrey Regiment
Major and Brevet Lieutenant-Colonel Robert Francis Hurter Wallace, Royal Highlanders
Temp Major and Brevet Lieutenant-Colonel Geoffrey Llewellyn Hinds Howell, Royal Army Service Corps
Major and Brevet Lieutenant-Colonel Humphry Waugh Snow  Reserve of Officers, Royal West Kent Regiment
Temp Lieutenant-Colonel William George Astell Ramsay-Fairfax  Tank Corps
Lieutenant-Colonel Francis Leger Christian Livingstone-Learmonth, Royal Artillery (employed Royal Artillery)
Lieutenant-Colonel William Reid Glover  London Regiment
Lieutenant-Colonel Edmund Farquhar St. John  Royal Artillery
Temp Lieutenant-Colonel Cyril Montagu Luck  Royal Engineers
Lieutenant-Colonel Edward James, Earl of Elgin and Kincardine, Royal Artillery
Major Francis Fane Lambarde 
Major Harold Charles Thoroton Hildyard 
Major Harry Romer Lee 
Major George Stuart Knox, Royal Engineers
Major William Kelson Russell  Royal Engineers
Lieutenant-Colonel Lancelot Richmond Beadon  Royal Army Service Corps
Major Gilbert Claud Hamilton  Grenadier Guards
Major Mervyn Meares  Royal Army Ordnance Corps
Major Henry Alexander Boyd  Royal Artillery
Temp Major Hubert Stanley Whitmore Pennington  Royal Army Service Corps
Major William Murray Stewart  Cameron Highlanders
Temp Major William Belfield, Royal Army Service Corps
Major John Poole Bowring Robinson  Royal Dublin Fusiliers
Major Rupert Caesar Smythe  Royal Inniskilling Fusiliers, attd. Royal Irish Rifles
Major Lancelot Edward Seth Ward  Royal Artillery, Oxfordshire & Buckinghamshire Light Infantry
Major Frederick George Skipwith, Labour Corps
Temp Major Joseph Dalrymple  Royal Army Medical Corps
Temp Major William Alfred Greenley  Royal Army Service Corps
Major Duncan Grant-Dalton  West Yorkshire Regiment, employed 19th Battalion, Welsh Regiment
Major John Inglis, Highland Light Infantry, employed Cameron Highlanders
Major Alan Hamer Maude  Royal Army Service Corps
Major Lawrence Chenevix-Trench  Royal Engineers
Major Leopold Christian Duncan Jenner 
Temp Major James Aubrey Smith, General List, employed Labour Corps
Captain Hubert Conrad Sparks  London Regiment
Captain and Brevet Major Edward Cuthbert de Renzy Martin  Yorkshire Light Infantry, attd. 11th Battalion, Lancashire Fusiliers
Captain and Brevet Major William Henry Annesley 
Canadian Force
Brigadier-General John Munro Ross  British Columbia Regiment
Brigadier-General Dennis Colburn Draper  Quebec Regiment
Brigadier-General Daniel Mowat Ormond  Alberta Regiment
Brigadier-General John Smith Stewart  Canadian Field Artillery
Brigadier-General Alexander Ross  Saskatchewan Regiment
Colonel Robert Percy Wright  Canadian Army Medical Corps
Colonel Alexander Macphail  Royal Canadian Engineers
Major and Brevet Lieutenant-Colonel William Beaumont Anderson  Royal Canadian Engineers
Lieutenant-Colonel Herbert John Dawson  Saskatchewan Regiment
Lieutenant-Colonel Archibald de Mowbray Bell, Canadian Army Service Corps
Lieutenant-Colonel Spurgeon Campbell, Canadian Army Medical Corps
Lieutenant-Colonel William Robert Bertram  Manitoba Regiment
Lieutenant-Colonel Stratton Harry Osler  Royal Canadian Engineers
Lieutenant-Colonel Johnson Lindsay Rowlett Parsons  Saskatchewan Regiment
Major Kenric Rud Marshall  Central Ontario Regiment
Lieutenant-Colonel John Franklin Kidd, Canadian Army Medical Corps
Australian Imperial Force
Colonel Edwin Tivey  General List, Australian Imperial Force
Colonel Evan Alexander Wisdom  General List, Australian Imperial Force
Colonel James Campbell Stewart  General List, Australian Imperial Force
Colonel Iven Gifford Mackay  General List, Australian Imperial Force
Colonel Henry Arthur Goddard  Australian Imperial Force
Colonel James Adam Dick, Australian Army Medical Corps
Lieutenant-Colonel Carl Herman Jess  General List, Australian Imperial Force
Lieutenant-Colonel Hector Osman Caddy  Australian Field Artillery
Lieutenant-Colonel Ernest Edward Herrod  7th Battalion, Australian Imperial Force
Lieutenant-Colonel William Gillian Allsop  Australian Field Artillery
Lieutenant-Colonel Herbert Thomas Christopher Layh  60th Battalion, Australian Infantry
Lieutenant-Colonel Donald Ticehurst Moore  3rd Battalion Australian Infantry
Lieutenant-Colonel Bertie Vandeleur Stacy  1st Battalion, Australian Infantry
Lieutenant-Colonel John Dudley Lavarack  Australian Field Artillery
Lieutenant-Colonel Charles James Martin, Australian Army Medical Corps
New Zealand Force
Colonel Donald Johnstone McGavin  New Zealand Medical Corps
Lieutenant-Colonel Donald Norman Watson Murray  New Zealand Medical Corps

For services rendered in connection with Military Operations in Egypt:
Colonel William Arthur Robinson  Royal Artillery
Lieutenant-Colonel Edward Charles Massy  Royal Artillery
Lieutenant-Colonel Evelyn Pierce Sewell  Royal Army Medical Corps
Lieutenant-Colonel The Honourable Guy Greville Wilson  East Riding of Yorkshire Yeomanry
Lieutenant-Colonel Ralph Maximilian Yorke  Gloucestershire Yeomanry
Major and Brevet Lieutenant-Colonel Archibald Percival Wavell  Royal Highlanders
Major and Brevet Lieutenant-Colonel Claude Stuart Rome  11th Hussars
Major and Brevet Lieutenant-Colonel Eric Montague Seton Charles  Royal Engineers
Major Randal Plunkett Taylor Hawksley  Royal Engineers
Major Noel Ernest Money  Shropshire Yeomanry
Major Arthur Drummond Borton  2/22nd Battalion, London Regiment
Australian Imperial Force
Lieutenant-Colonel Thomas John Todd  10th Australian Light Horse Regiment

For services rendered in connection with Military Operations in Italy:
Lieutenant-Colonel and Brevet Colonel The Honourable John Francis Gathorne-Hardy  Grenadier Guards
Major and Brevet Colonel Herbert Richard Done  Norfolk Regiment
Lieutenant-Colonel Henry Edward Gogarty  Worcestershire Regiment
Lieutenant-Colonel Samuel Arthur Archer, Royal Army Medical Corps
Lieutenant-Colonel Harry Arthur Leonard Howell, Royal Army Medical Corps
Lieutenant-Colonel John Weir West  Royal Army Medical Corps
Lieutenant-Colonel Charles Hilton Furnivall, Royal Army Medical Corps
Major and Brevet Lieutenant-Colonel George Henry Barnett  King's Royal Rifle Corps
Major and Brevet Lieutenant-Colonel Cyril Darcy Vivian Cary-Barnard  Wiltshire Regiment
Major and Brevet Lieutenant-Colonel Raymond Theodore Pelly  North Lancashire Regiment Spec. Reserve
Major Charles Henry Marion Bingham  Royal Army Service Corps
Major John Leonard Jesse  Royal Army Service Corps
Major James Henry Edward Holford  Nottinghamshire Yeomanry, attd. 12th Battalion, Durham Light Infantry
Major Everard How Rooke  Royal Engineers
Temp Major Philip Cahill Sheridan, Royal Engineers
Honorary Colonel Sir Harry Waechter  Royal Field Artillery
Temp Lieutenant-Colonel Sydney Douglas Rumbold  York & Lancaster Regiment

For valuable services rendered in connection with Military Operations in Salonika:
Lieutenant-Colonel Claude Buist Martin  Royal Army Medical Corps
Lieutenant-Colonel Harold Eustace Carey  Royal Artillery
Lieutenant-Colonel Ralph Henvey  Royal Artillery
Lieutenant-Colonel Douglas Keith Elphinstone Hall  3rd Battalion, Dorsetshire Regiment (Spec. Reserve)
Major and Brevet Lieutenant-Colonel Bernard John Majendie  King's Royal Rifle Corps
Lieutenant-Colonel Herbert Ellicombe Molesworth  Royal Garrison Artillery
Major and Brevet Lieutenant-Colonel George Ireland Fraser  Cameron Highlanders
Major and Brevet Lieutenant-Colonel Philip Lewis Hanbury  Shropshire Light Infantry
Major Douglas Charles Faichnie, Royal Army Ordnance Corps

For valuable services rendered in connection with Military Operations in North Russia:
Lieutenant-Colonel John Josselyn  6th (Cyclist) Battalion, Suffolk Regiment
Temp Lieutenant-Colonel Frederick Henry Wickham Guard  General List
Temp Lieutenant-Colonel Philip James Woods  General List

Honorary Companions
His Highness Mahommed Shemseddin Iskander, Sultan of the Maldive Islands
Oladugbolu Onikepe, Alafin of Oyo, Unofficial Member of the Nigerian Council

The Most Eminent Order of the Indian Empire

Knight Grand Commander (GCIE) 
His Highness Farzand-Khas-DauIat-Inglishia Maharaja Sir Sayaji Rao Gaekwar Sena Khas Khel Shamsher Bahadur  Maharaja of Baroda
Lieutenant-Colonel His Highness Sawai Maharaja Sir Jai Singh Bahadur  Maharaja of Alwar, Rajputana

Knight Commander (KCIE) 
Nicholas Dodd Beatson-Bell  Indian Civil Service, Chief Commissioner of Assam
William Sinclair Marris  Indian Civil Service, Joint Secretary to the Government of India, Home Department (on deputation)
Mehtar Shuja ul-Mulk  of Chitral, North-West Frontier Province 
Khan Bahadur Maulvi Rahim Bakhsh  President, Council of Regency, Bahawalpur
James Herbert Seabrooke  Joint Secretary, Military Department, India Office

Companion (CIE) 
Lewis Sydney Steward O'Malley, Indian Civil Service, Secretary to the Government of Bengal
Provash Chandra Mitter, Calcutta
James George Jennings, Director of Public Instruction, Bihar and Orissa
Samuel Perry O'Donnell, Indian Civil Service, Chief Secretary, Government of United Provinces
Edward Mitchener Cook, Indian Civil Service, Controller of Currency, Bombay
Christian Tindall, Indian Civil Service, Secretary to Government of Bengal
Arthur Innes Mayhew, Director of Public Instruction, Central Provinces
William Crooke, Indian Civil Service (retired)
Vincent Arthur Smith, Indian Civil Service (retired)
Austin Low  Chairman of Northbrook Society
Lieutenant-Colonel Andrew Alexander Irvine, Indian Army, Punjab Commission, District Judge, Montgomery, Punjab
Hubert Digby Watson, Indian Civil Service, Deputy Commissioner, Jullunder, Punjab
George Ernle Chatfield, Indian Civil Service, Collector and Magistrate, Ahmedabad, Bombay
Lieutenant-Colonel John Telfer Calvert  Indian Medical Service, Principal, Medical College, Calcutta
Charles Gilbert Rogers, Chief Conservator of Forests, Burma
Bernard d'Olier Barley, Executive Engineer, Tarai, United Provinces
Thomas Heed Davy Bell, Chief Conservator of Forests, Bombay
Walter Francis Perree, Conservator of Forests, Kumaon, United Provinces
Bertram Beresford Osmaston, President, Forest Research Institute and College, Dehra Dun, United Provinces
Major John Hanna Murray  Indian Medical Service, Andaman Islands
Reverend Dr. William Skinner, Principal, Madras Christian College, Madras
Colonel Herbert Augustus Iggulden, Commanding Bangalore Brigade
Major and Brevet Lieutenant-Colonel Richard Stukeley St. John  Indian Army, Embarkation Commandant, Bombay
Major Stanley Somerset Wreford Paddon, Staff Officer attached to Military Department, India Office
Major Walter Mason  Chairman, Surma Valley Branch of Indian Tea Association, Assam
William Alfred Rae Wood, His Britannic Majesty's Consul, Chiengmai, Siam
John Carlos Kennedy Peterson, Indian Civil Service, Controller of Munitions, Bengal
Lieutenant-Colonel Andrew Louis Charles McCormick, Royal Engineers, Senior Mint Master, Calcutta
Lieutenant-Colonel Francis Edward Swinton, Indian Medical Service, Medical Storekeeper, Bombay
Lieutenant-Colonel John Charles Lamont  Indian Medical Service (retired), Professor of Anatomy, Medical College, Lahore, Punjab
Captain Charles James Cope Kendall  Royal Indian Marine
Sardar Bahadur Lieutenant-Colonel Muhammad Afzal Khan, Commandant, Bahawalpur Imperial Service Camel Corps
Ernest Albert Seymour Bell, Agent, Eastern Bengal State Railway
Major Francis Richard Soutter Gervers, Royal Engineers, Officiating Assistant Commanding Royal Engineers, Nowshera, North-West Frontier Province
Colin John Davidson, His Britannic Majesty's Vice-Consul, Yokohama
Francis John Preston, Chief Engineer, Great Indian Peninsula Railway, Bombay
Albert Harlow Silver, Indian Munitions Board
Frederick William Hanson, late General Traffic Manager, Bombay, Baroda and Central India Railway
Nawab Malik Khuda Bakhsh Khan Tiwanar  Revenue Member, Bahawalpur, Punjab
Khan Bahadur Maula Bakhsh, Attaché, Foreign and Political Department
Colonel Vindeshri Prasad Singh, Chief Secretary, Benares State. Sardar Lakhamgouda Basava Prabhu Sir Desai, Vantmuri, Bombay

The Royal Victorian Order

Knight Grand Cross of the Royal Victorian Order (GCVO) 
Major-General His Highness Sir Ganga Singhr Bahadur, Maharaja of Bikanir  Aide-de-camp to the King
Richard Farrer, Baron Berschell 
Commander Sir Charles Leopold Cust  Royal Navy

Knight Commander of the Royal Victorian Order (KCVO) 
Major-General Lionel Arthur Montagu Stopford 
Sir George Anderson Critchett

Commander of the Royal Victorian Order (CVO) 
Sir Edward Rigg 
Colonel Arthur Robert Dick  
Colonel Malcolm David Graham  Aide-de-camp to the King
The Right Rev. Andrew Wallace Williamson, Dean of the Thistle

Member of the Royal Victorian Order, 4th class (MVO) 
Lieutenant-Colonel Alan Ian, Duke of Northumberland
Major Archibald, Baron Blythswood, Scots Guards
Captain Wilfrid Tomkinson  Royal Navy
Colonel Vernor Chater
Colonel Charles Wheler Hume
Lieutenant-Colonel Sydney Lewis Penhorwood, Canadian Forestry Corps
Major North Victor Cecil Dalrymple Hamilton, Scots Guards
Lieutenant-Commander Charles Granville Naylor, Royal Navy (dated 20 November 1918)

The Most Excellent Order of the British Empire

Dame Grand Cross of the Order of the British Empire (GBE)

Military Division 
Sidney Jane Browne  Matron-in-Chief, Territorial Nursing Service

Civil Division 
Her Royal Highness Princess Beatrice, President of the Isle of Wight Branch, British Red Cross Society
Her Highness Princess Marie Louise, Head of the Bermondsey Voluntary Hospital
Adeline Marie, Duchess of Bedford, Member of Joint War Committee, British Red Cross Society and Order of St. John of Jerusalem in England; President of the Ladies' Committee of the Order of St. John
Mildred, Viscountess Buxton
Sarah Ann Swift  Matron-in-Chief, British Red Cross Society and Order of St. John of Jerusalem in England
Beatrix Frances, Marchioness of Waterford, Head of the Irish War Hospitals Supply Depots; Member of the Joint War Committee for Leinster, Munster and Connaught; British Red Cross Society and Order of St. John of Jerusalem in England

Knight Grand Cross of the Order of the British Empire (GBE)

Military Division 
Lieutenant-General Sir Henry Crichton Sclater

Civil Division 
Walter Durnford  Provost of King's College, Cambridge
Sir Charles Edward Ellis  Member of Ministry of Munitions Council and Representative of the Ministry in France and Italy; previously Director-General of Ordnance Supply; late Managing Director, Messrs. John Brown & Co., Ltd.
William Robert Wellesley, Viscount Peel, Chairman of Panel, Military Service (Government Departments) Committee; Chairman of Disabled Sailors' and Soldiers' Compensation Committee; formerly Chairman of the Committee on Detention of Neutral Vessels and of the Black List Committee
George Fitzroy Henry, Baron Raglan  Late Lieutenant-Governor of the Isle of Man
Colonel Sir Edward Willis Duncan Ward  Director-General of Voluntary Organisations; Commanding and Chief Staff Officer of the Metropolitan Special Constabulary

Dame Commander of the Order of the British Empire (DBE)

Military Division 
Florence Edith Victoria Leach  Controller-in-Chief, Queen Mary's Army Auxiliary Corps

Civil Division 
Rachel Eleanor Crowdy  Principal Commandant, Voluntary Aid Detachments in France
Henrietta Caroline, Lady Henderson
Lady Blanche Gordon-Lennox, Director of H.R.H. Princess Victoria's Rest Clubs for Nurses
Georgiana, Baroness Mount Stephen, Queen Mary's Needlework Guild

Knight Commander of the Order of the British Empire (KBE)

Military Division 
Royal Navy
Admiral Robert Nelson Ommanney  
Rear-Admiral Edward Fitzmaurice Inglefield 
Rear-Admiral Edmund Radcliffe Pears 

Army
Honorary Lieutenant-Colonel Henry Worth Thornton, Royal Engineers
Major George McLaren Brown
Temp Honorary Colonel John Lynn-Thomas 
Colonel Harry Edwin Bruce Bruce-Porter  Army Medical Service
Brevet Lieutenant-Colonel Thomas Duncan Rhind  Chief Recorder, Ministry of National Service

For services rendered in connection with military operations in France and Flanders:
Temp Colonel Sir Almroth Edward Wright  Army Medical Service
Major General The Right Honourable Lovick Bransby Friend  Royal Engineers
Colonel General Samuel Hickson  Army Medical Service

Civil Division 
Francis Theodore Boys, Principal Director of Meat Supplies, Ministry of Food
Cecil Lindsay Budd  Member of Non-ferrous Materials Department, Ministry of Munitions; Chairman of the Copper Committee and British Representative on the Inter-Allied Non-Ferrous Materials Committee
Edward Napier Burnett  Chairman of the Economic Committee of the Army Medical Department, War Office
Geoffrey Butler  Director of the British Bureau of Information, U.S.A.
James Carmichael  Chairman of the Munition Works Board and of the Building Materials Supply Committee; Member of the Surplus Government Property Disposal Board
Thomas Clement, Chairman of the Cheese and Butter Import Committee, Ministry of Food
Sir Clement Kinloch-Cooke 
Major Algernon Tudor-Craig  Secretary, Incorporated Soldiers' and Sailors' Help Society
Richard James Curtis, Food Commissioner for the Midland Division
Percy Daniels, Head of Leather Purchasing Commission, British War Mission in U.S.A.
Sir Alfred Eyles  Late Accountant-General of the Navy
Herbert Gibson, Wheat Commissioner for the Royal Commission on Wheat Supplies in Argentina and Uruguay
Sir Frederick Green, League of Mercy
Sir Henry Rider Haggard, Member of the Dominions Royal Commission and of the Empire Settlement Committee
Laurence Edward Halsey, Honorary Accountant, Prince of Wales's National Relief Fund
William John Jones  Member of Iron and Steel Production Department, Ministry of Munitions
John McKie Lees  Sheriff of Forfarshire and Convener of the Sheriffs of Scotland
Norman Alexander Leslie  Transport Department, Ministry of Shipping; Organiser of British and Allied Shipping in connection with the convoy system
Alexander Mackenzie, Rio de Janeiro
John McLaren  Chairman Board of Control, National Ordnance Factories, Leeds, Ministry of Munitions; Chairman of Messrs. J. & H. McLaren, Midland Engine Works, Leeds
Henry McLaughlin, Member of the Irish Recruiting Council
Lieutenant-Colonel John Herbert Mansell  Managing Director, Coventry Ordnance Works
Captain William Maxwell
George Douglas Cochrane Newton, Assistant Secretary (unpaid), Rural Reconstruction Department, Ministry of Reconstruction
Bernard Pares, Professor of Russian, University of London
John Pedder  Assistant Secretary, Home Office; Member of the Central Control Board (Liquor Traffic)
His Honour Judge George Bettesworth Piggott  Chairman of Special Military Service Tribunal for London and Deputy Chairman of the House of Commons Section of the Appeal Tribunal for London
Colonel Thomas Andrew Polson  Chief Inspector of Clothing, Royal Army Clothing Department
William Jackson Pope  Member of the Chemical Warfare Committee, Ministry of Munitions; Professor of Chemistry, Cambridge University
George Archdall O'Brien Reid 
Ashley Sparks, Director-General of British Ministry of Shipping in U.S.A.
Commander Guy Standing  British War Mission to U.S.A.
Aubrey Strahan  Director of the Geological Survey of Great Britain and of the Geological Museum
William Thorn, Chairman, Blackburn Board of Management, Ministry of Munitions; Member of the Engineering Trades (New Industries) Committee of the Ministry of Reconstruction; Director of Messrs. Yates & Thorn, Ltd.
James Howard Warrack, Member of the Admiralty Transport Arbitration Board; ex-President of the Chamber of Shipping of the United Kingdom
William Alfred Waterlow, Managing Director of Messrs. Waterlow Bros. & Layton
Arthur Francis Whinney, Adviser on Costs of Production, Admiralty
Colonel William Hale-White  Royal Army Medical Corps, Chairman and Consultant, Queen Mary's Royal Naval Hospital, Southend
Arthur Willert, Correspondent of The Times at Washington; Late Secretary of the British War Mission in Washington
John Bowring Wimble, Chairman of London Shipowners' and Transport Workers' Military Service Committee
James Williams Woods, Director of Purchases, British War Mission in U.S.A.
John Wormald, Chairman of the General Service and Industries Committees, War Priorities Committee; Managing Director, Messrs. Mather and Platt
Albert William Wyon, Senior Partner, Messrs. Price, Waterhouse & Co.; Government Accountant of Controlled Canals, etc.

British India
Lieutenant-Colonel Hector Travers Dennys  Indian Army, Inspector-General of Police, Punjab
Sir Stanley Reed, Vice-President, Central Publicity Board
Sir Henry George Richards  Chief Justice of the High Court of Allahabad
Lieutenant-Colonel James Wishart Thomson, Agent to the Shipping Controller in India

Sudan
Colonel Edgar Edwin Bernard  Financial Secretary of the Sudan Government

Diplomatic Service and Overseas List
Colonies, Protectorates, etc.

Commander of the Order of the British Empire (CBE)

Military Division 
Royal Navy
Captain Rowland Henry Bather 
Paymaster Captain George Christopher Aubin Boyer 
Surgeon-Captain George Thomas Broach 
Commander Wilfred Montague Bruce  Royal Naval Reserve
Captain Adolphus Edmund Bell, Trinity House
Commander Thomas Evans Crease 
Captain John Gilbert de Odingsells Coke 
Captain George Knightley Chetwode 
Honorary Paymaster Captain Henry Ashley Travers Cummins 
Captain Herbert Edward Purey-Cust  Royal Naval Reserve (Vice-Admiral, retired)
Captain Arthur Wellesley Clarke, Trinity House
Paymaster Captain Charles Augustus Royer Flood Dunbar
Captain Frederic Charles Dreyer 
Commander George Duncan 
Captain John Dodson Daintree
Commander Francis Edmund Musgrave Garforth
Captain Thomas Golding, Trinity House
Paymaster Commander Hugh Seymour Hall 
Captain Arthur Halsey 
Rear-Admiral Hugh Thomas Hibbert 
Captain Owen Jones, Trinity House
Commander Henry Douglas King  Royal Naval Reserve
Rear-Admiral Albert Sumner Lafone
Captain Charles Henry Clarke Langdon
Rear-Admiral Edgar Lees
Rear-Admiral Frederick Charles Learmonth  
Captain Frank Oswald Lewis 
Captain Armytage Anthony Lucas
Paymaster Commander William Henry le Brun
Rear-Admiral George Robert Mansell  Trinity House
Captain Oswald Percival Marshall, Trinity House
Engineer Captain Henry Wray Metcalfe 
Engineer Captain George William Murray 
Captain John Warde Osborne
Commander Francis Hungerford Pollen 
Commander Arthur Henry Rostron  Royal Naval Reserve
Engineer Captain George William Roome 
Paymaster Captain Harry Robinson
Captain John Barnes Sparks 
Commander Charles Valentine Smith 
Surgeon-Captain Vidal Gunson Thorpe 
Captain Anthony Standidge Thomson, Trinity House
Captain Charles William Thomas 
Captain Lionel de Lautour Wells 

Army
Colonel Herbert Edward Stacy Abbott  Royal Engineers
Colonel Charles Henry Alexander, Royal Artillery
Brevet Colonel Alfred James Arnold  late 3rd Dragoon Guards
Honorary Brigadier-General Edward William David Baird, late Suffolk Yeomanry
Temp Lieutenant-Colonel William Neilson Bicket, Royal Engineers
Brevet Lieutenant-Colonel Chetwynd Rokeby Alfred Bond, late Indian Staff Corps
Temp Lieutenant-Colonel Frederick Henry Browning, Special List
Colonel Paul Robert Burn-Clerk-Rattray, late Royal Engineers
Lieutenant-Colonel Charles Walker Cathcart  Royal Army Medical Corps
Colonel Thomas Henry Matthews Clarke  Army Medical Service
Quartermaster and Major Henry Clay  East Surrey Regiment
Colonel Evelyn Rivers Henry Josias Cloete, Royal Artillery
Colonel Lionel Combe, late Royal Dublin Fusiliers
Captain George Northcote Crisford, Inspector of Regions, Ministry of National Service
Colonel George Dansey-Browning, Army Medical Service
Colonel Edward Kaye Daubeney  late South Staffordshire Regiment
Colonel Algernon Cecil Dawson, Territorial Force Association
Brevet Colonel Simeon Hardy Exham  Royal Engineers
Lieutenant-Colonel Sir Joseph Fayrer  Royal Army Medical Corps
Colonel Henry Finnis  Royal Engineers
Lieutenant-Colonel Thomas Ernie Fowlo, Extra Regimentally employed List, South African Military Command
Lieutenant-Colonel Robert John Harvey Gibson, Cadet Battalion, Liverpool Regiment
Colonel Edward George Grogan  late Royal Highlanders
Major Stuart Hartshorn  Secretary, East Midlands Region, Ministry of National Service
Brevet Colonel Robert Elton Home  Royal Artillery
Colonel Charles Vesey Humphrys, late West Riding Regiment
Colonel Herbert Rowett Henry Jack  late Royal Army Service Corps
Colonel Richard Jennings  late Army Medical Service
Major Sir Kenneth Hagar Kemp  3rd Battalion, Norfolk Regiment
Brevet Colonel Charles Douglas Learoyd, late Royal Engineers
Brevet Colonel Arthur Russell Loscombe, late West India Regiment
Colonel Francis Douglas Lumley  late Middlesex Regiment
Brevet Major Henry Davies Foster MacGeagh, 5th Battalion, London Regiment
Temp Lieutenant-Colonel Henry William Madoc, Special List
Colonel Ernest Elliott Markwick  Royal Army Ordnance Corps
Colonel Alfred Douglas Miller  late 2nd Dragoons
Captain Peter Chalmers Mitchell  British War Mission in U.S.A.
Major Henry John Neilson, late Royal Army Medical Corps
Captain Geoffrey Kelsall Peto, Wiltshire Yeomanry; Director of Projectile Contracts, Ministry of Munitions
Lieutenant-Colonel George Julian Selwyn Scovell, Cameron Highlanders
Temp Honorary Major Henry Session Souttar  Royal Army Medical Corps
Colonel Herbert Brooke Taylor  Territorial Force Association (late 2nd Battalion, Nottinghamshire and Derbyshire Regiment)
Brevet Colonel Philip Beauchamp Taylor, Royal Artillery
Colonel Herbert Radclyffe Vaughan, late Royal Warwickshire Regiment
Colonel Anthony Mildmay Julian, Earl of Westmorland  Lancashire Fusiliers (Spec. Reserve)
Lieutenant-Colonel George Alexander Eason Wilkinson  Royal Defence Corps
Brevet Colonel Charles Henry Luttrell Fahie Wilson, late Royal Artillery
Colonel Fitzgerald Wintour  late Royal West Kent Regiment
Overseas Military Forces of Canada
Colonel George Devey Farmer, Canadian Army Medical Corps
Lieutenant-Colonel William Ross Smyth, Canadian Forestry Corps
Colonel John Stewart, Canadian Army Medical Corps
Colonel Walter Reginald Ward, Canadian General List
Australian Imperial Force
Colonel Thomas Griffiths  
Colonel John Patrick McGlinn 
Lieutenant-Colonel Murray McWhae  Australian Army Medical Corps
Colonel Henry Carr Maudsley  Australian Army Medical Corps
Administrative Headquarters of New Zealand
Major William Marshall Macdonald  New Zealand Medical Corps
Lieutenant-Colonel Henry John McLean  New Zealand Medical Corps
Lieutenant-Colonel George Spafford Richardson  New Zealand Staff Corps
Union of South Africa
Temp Lieutenant-Colonel Edward Newbury Thornton  South African Medical Corps

For services rendered in connection with military operations in France and Flanders:
Lieutenant-Colonel Hugh Fenwick Brooke  Royal Army Service Corps
Colonel Francis William John Caulfield, Indian Army
Rev. Arthur James William Crosse, Royal Army Chaplains' Department
Colonel Arthur Bruce Dunsterville  late East Surrey Regiment
Quartermaster and Major Joseph Vinters Laughton, 21st Lancers, attd. Tank Corps
Brevet Lieutenant-Colonel Charles Lane Magniac  Royal Engineers
Lieutenant-Colonel Lewis Francis Philips  King's Royal Rifle Corps
Colonel Joseph Howard Poett  late Staff

Overseas Military Forces of Canada
For services rendered in connection with military operations in France and Flanders:
Lieutenant-Colonel Count Henry Robert Visart de Bury and de Bocarmé, Canadian Ordnance Corps
Major William Samuel Fetherstonhaugh  Canadian Forestry Corps
Lieutenant-Colonel Arthur Murray Jarvis  Canadian General List
Lieutenant-Colonel George Hamilton Johnson, Canadian Forestry Corps
Lieutenant-Colonel John Lawrence Miller, Canadian Forestry Corps
Principal Matron Ethel Blanche Ridley  Canadian Nursing Service
Australian Imperial Force
Principal Matron Grace Margaret Wilson  Army Auxiliary Nursing Service

For valuable services rendered in connection with Military Operations in Egypt:
Major and Brevet Lieutenant-Colonel William John Ainsworth  Durham Light Infantry
Temp Colonel Charles Coley Choyce  Royal Army Medical Corps
Temp Major Lyall Newcombe Cooper  Royal Engineers
Major and Brevet Lieutenant-Colonel Aylmer Basil Cunningham  Royal Engineers
Lieutenant-Colonel Cathcart Garner  late Royal Army Medical Corps
Major and Brevet Lieutenant-Colonel George Lennox Hay  Royal Army Ordnance Corps
Major Watkin Randle Kynaston Mainwaring, Denbighshire Yeomanry
Lieutenant-Colonel and Brevet Colonel Evelyn Pollock, Royal Jersey Militia Artillery
Lieutenant-Colonel Arthur Kennedy Rawlins  24th Punjabis, Indian Army
Local Colonel Ronald Storrs 
Major and Brevet Lieutenant-Colonel Bertie Harry Waters Taylor, South Staffordshire Regiment
Major Arthur George Todd  Royal Army Veterinary Corps
Australian Imperial Force
Lieutenant-Colonel Graham Patrick Dixon, Australian Army Medical Corps
Lieutenant-Colonel David Fulton, 3rd Light Horse Regiment
Colonel Duncan McLeish  Australian Remount Service
Lieutenant-Colonel Frank Graham Newton, General List

For services rendered in connection with Military Operations in Egypt:
Lieutenant-Colonel George Vawdrey  Royal Army Service Corps

Royal Air Force
Lieutenant-Colonel Thomas David Collis Barry
Lieutenant-Colonel Thomas Reginald Cave-Browne-Cave
Lieutenant-Colonel Frederick Holders Cleaver 
Lieutenant-Colonel Christopher Lloyd Courtney 
Lieutenant-Colonel Francis Richard Drake
Honorary Lieutenant-Colonel Richard Frederick Drury 
Major Herbert Charles Ellis
Major Martin William Flack 
Lieutenant-Colonel Napier John Gill 
Lieutenant-Colonel John Crosby Halahan
Lieutenant-Colonel Charles Brehmer Heald
Lieutenant-Colonel Francis Richard Gurney Hoare
Honorary Lieutenant-Colonel Harold Edward Sherwin Holt 
Lieutenant-Colonel James Murray Home
Lieutenant-Colonel John Archibald Houison-Crauford
Major Sir Norman Roderick Alexander David Leslie
Brevet Lieutenant-Colonel Archibald Campbell Holms Maclean
Major Harold Arthur Moore 
Acting Lieutenant-Colonel Francis Frederick Muecke  
Lieutenant-Colonel Alec Ogilvie 
Lieutenant-Colonel Douglas Powell
Lieutenant-Colonel Charles Russel Jekyl Randall
Colonel John Miles Steel
Lieutenant-Colonel Ralph Durrant Sadleir Stoney
Lieutenant-Colonel Reginald George Talbot
Lieutenant-Colonel Cecil Henry Whittington

Civil Division 
Bennet Hoskyns-Abrahall, Director, Investigation Branch, Secretary's Office, General Post Office
Annie Crawford Acheson, Head of Plastic Department, Orthopaedic Branch, Queen Mary's Needlework Guild
Hartley Aspden  Honorary Organiser of the "Beyond Seas" Association
Constance Alice Bacon, Deputy President, Norfolk Branch, British Red Cross Society
Arthur Baker, Late British Red Cross Commissioner, Romania
George Henry Banister, Special Director, Messrs. Vickers, Ltd.
Lieutenant-Colonel Arthur John Barry  Commandant, Red Cross Convoys with the French Commission, France
C. W. Bayne, Montevideo
William John Benson  Ministry of Munitions
Major John Lawrence Benthall  Director, Messrs. Vickers, Ltd.
William George Black  Convener of Standing Voluntary Aid Detachment, Committee, Scottish Branch; British Red Cross Society
Mary Booth Booth  Salvation Army
Thomas Johnstone Bourne, War Office Representative in China
William Boyd, Deputy Director-General of British Ministry of Shipping, New York
Catherine Lavinia Brunskill, Late Private Secretary to the Adjutant-General
Sir Richard Woodman Burbidge 
John Macmaster Campbell 
Captain Arthur Edward Capel, Political Assistant Secretary to the British Section of the Supreme War Council, Versailles
Ernest Bruce Charles  Director, Wounded and Missing Inquiry Department, Havre
George Christopher Clayton  Director, The United Alkali Company., Ltd.
John William Cobb, Livesey Professor of Coal, Gas, and Fuel Industries, Leeds University; Deputy Inspector of High Explosives, Ministry of Munitions, Leeds Area
Richard James Coles  Acting Director of Finance, Ministry of Pensions
Lady Gwendoline Audrey Adeline Brudenell Colvin, Chairman, Executive Committee, Essex Branch, British Red Cross Society
William Patrick Joseph Connolly  Principal Clerk, Chief Secretary's Office, Dublin
Andrew Crawford, Assistant Accountant-General, Ministry of Shipping
John Gray Crookston, Controller of Propaganda in Russia, Ministry of Information
Henry Hallett Dale 
John Ford Darling
The Honourable Arthur Jex Davey, Deputy Director of Army Contracts (Honorary) (to date 9 October 1918)
Charles William Dawkins, Controller of Contracts, Ministry of Information
George Francis Dixon, Marine Superintendent, South-Eastern and Chatham Railway
Kathleen, Countess of Drogheda
John Edmund Drower, Assistant Director of Army Contracts
Lieutenant-Colonel Francis Dudley Williams-Drummond  Live Stock Commissioner for South Wales
Alfred Eichholz  Senior Assistant Medical Officer, Board of Education
Marjory Edith Robertson-Eustace, Organiser and Administrator of the first Rest Club for Nursing Sisters in France
Katharine Waldo Douglas Fedden  Chairman of the Belgravia War Hospital Supply Depot
Walter George Fish, Department of Controller of Coal Mines, Board of Trade
Charles Browning Fisher, Joint Agricultural Adviser to Ministry of Food; Liaison Officer with Irish Food Control Committee
Francis John FitzGerald  Chairman, Oxfordshire Appeal Tribunal
The Reverend Adam Forman, Honorary Secretary, Sphagnum Moss Committee
Major Wilfrid Lionel Foster  Organiser, Royal Artillery Prisoners of War Fund
Annie Christine Fountain
Walter John Fryer, Manager (Honorary), Royal Army Clothing Department Factories
James Clerk Maxwell Garnett, Principal, Municipal College of Technology, Manchester
Hope Gibson, Buenos Aires
Grace Catherine Rose Davies-Gilbert, Deputy President, Eastbourne Division, Sussex Branch, British Red Cross Society
The Honourable Maud Ernestine Gladstone, Vice-President, Chester City Division, Cheshire Branch, British Red Cross Society
Ernest Hope Goddard, Acting Editor of The Illustrated London News and The Sketch
Neil Forbes Grant, Editor, Cables and Wireless, Ministry of Information
John Arch Greene, Food Commissioner for Yorkshire Division
Mabel Laura, Countess Grey, President, Northumberland Branch, British Red Cross Society
Herbert Austen Groves, Deputy to the Assistant Secretary, Admiralty
William Joseph Haines  Salvation Army
Frederick Eardley John Blackburne-Hall  Food Commissioner for the Home Counties (North and South) Division
Brigadier-General Dayrell Talbot Hammond  Military Adviser and Chief of Staff to the Irish Recruiting Council
Lancelot Hannen, Organiser of Christie's "Our Day" Red Cross Sales
Frank Hastings, Secretary, Headquarters Staff, British Red Cross Society
Gerald Edward Chadwyck-Healey, Director of Materials and Priority, Admiralty
Lady Victoria Alexandrina Mary Cecil Herbert, Organiser, Lady Victoria Herbert's Prisoners of War Fund
David Wilson Hood, Engineer-in-Chief, Trinity House
Stanley Wyndham Jamieson, Private Secretary to Deputy Secretary of State for War 
Paymaster Lieutenant-Commander David Thomas Jones  Secretary of the Fishery Board for Scotland
Edgar Heath-Jones  Financial Secretary, Central Prisoners of War Committee
James Donald Keay, Engine Works Manager, Messrs. Harland & Wolff, Ltd.
Chris Shotter Kent  British War Mission in U.S.A.
William Walker Lackie, Chief Engineer, Glasgow Corporation Electricity Department
Hilary Howard Leng 
John Lewis 
Sir Robert Ashton Lister, Commissioner for War Savings, West of England
Albert Henry Lloyd, Secretary, Recreation Huts Department, Church Army
Samuel Cook Lloyd  Chairman, Dudley Local War Pensions Committee
Arthur Labron Lowe  Registrar, Birmingham County Court
Samuel Lyle  Commissioner of Medical Services, Ministry of National Service
Lieutenant Charles William Home McCall  Controller of Appointments Department, Ministry of Labour
Margaret Craig, Lady McCullagh  President, Belfast Branch, Queen Mary's Needlework Guild
Alexander Patrick McDougall, Live Stock Commissioner for Scotland
Eric Robert Dalrymple Maclagan, Controller for France, Ministry of Information
Thomas McMillan, City Treasurer, Glasgow
Julia McMordie  President of St. John Voluntary Aid Detachment's for Belfast
Hilda Madeleine, Countess of March, President of the Sussex Branch and of the Bermondsey Division, Soldiers' and Sailors' Families Association; Representative of the Association on the War Pensions Statutory Committee
Dudley Sinclair Marjoribanks, Local Director, Messrs. Sir W. G. Armstrong, Whitworth & Co., Ltd.; Vice-Chairman, Engineering Employers Advisory Committee
Arthur Mellersh, Surveyor, General Post Office
Thomas Graham Menzies, Director of Special Construction, Civil Engineer in Chief's Department, Admiralty
John Moffat, Vice-Chairman, National Allied Relief Committee
Lieutenant-General George Hay Moncrieff, Vice-Chairman, Incorporated Soldiers' and Sailors' Help Society (to date 14 October 1918)
George Morgan  Controller, Post Office Stores Department
The Honourable Helen Mary, Lady Murray, Directress, Lady Murray's Red Cross Hospital, Le Tréport
Charles Lee Nichols, Honorary Auditor, British Red Cross Society and Order of St. John
Henry Obré, Chairman of No. 8 Red Cross (Baltic and Corn Exchange) Hospital, Étaples
James George O'Keefe  British War Mission in U.S.A.
Beryl Carnegy, Lady Oliver  Head of the Naval and Military Voluntary Aid Detachment, Department, British Red Cross Society
Charles Augustus Oliver, Assistant Director of Navy Contracts
Henry Hughes-Onslow, Government Committee on Treatment of Prisoners of War
Jonathan Orchard  Chief Inspector of Customs and Excise
Lieutenant-Commander Henry Edward Clarence Paget  Head of the Observation Service, Metropolitan Special Constabulary
John Robert Pakeman
Standen Leonard Pearce, Chief Engineer and Manager, Manchester Corporation Electricity Department
Louis Frederick Pearson, Chairman, Nottingham Munitions Board of Management
Admiral Frederick Sidney Pelham, County Director, Auxiliary Hospitals and Voluntary Aid Detachments, Sussex
Beatrice Eleanor, Countess of Pembroke and Montgomery  Vice-President, Wiltshire Branch, British Red Cross Society; Organiser, Wilton House Auxiliary Hospital, Salisbury
William Piercy, Director of the Allied Provisions Export Commission, U.S.A.
Richard Pigott  Director of Tea Supplies, Ministry of Food
Ernest Manifold Raeburn, Director of Transport Department, British Ministry of Shipping in U.S.A.
Charles Julius Reiss, Secretary, Liner Requisition Committee, Ministry of Shipping
George Quinlan Roberts, Secretary, St. Thomas's Hospital
George Robey
Lady Charlotte Emma Maud Rolleston, Honorary Secretary of the Nottinghamshire County Branch and of the Nottingham Division, Soldiers' and Sailors' Families' Association
James Stirling Ross, Deputy Assistant Financial Secretary, Air Ministry
Florence Haynes-Rudge, Commandant and Donor, Abbey Manor Auxiliary Hospital, Evesham, Worcestershire
Alexander Whitehead Sampson, Director of Auxiliary Vessels, Admiralty
Harry Sterratt Seddon, Joint Honorary Treasurer, Lancashire County War Comforts Association
Robert Hope Selbie, Controller of Horse Transport, Board of Trade
Thomas Shaw  Director of National Service, West Midlands Region
William Barbour Shaw, Director, Factory Construction Department, Ministry of Munitions
Herbert John Simmonds  Assistant Secretary, Board of Education; Secretary to the Advisory Committee of the Military Service (Civil Liabilities) Committee
Robert Patrick Sloan, Managing Director, Newcastle Electric Supply Co., Ltd.
Lieutenant-Colonel Hugh Morton Stobart  Deputy Controller, Cultivation Division, Food Production Department
George William Stonestreet  Director of Stamping, Board of Inland Revenue
James Bruce Strain, Deputy Controller, Department of Gun Ammunition Filling, Ministry of Munitions
Percival Francis Swain  Principal Clerk, Public Trustee Office
Edgar William Thomas  Financial Adviser to the Public Trustee
Colonel William Gordon Thomson  Red Cross Commissioner, Central Eastern District of Scotland, and Honorary Secretary and Acting County Director for the County of the City of Dundee, Scottish Branch, British Red Cross Society
Arthur Edward Towle, Assistant Secretary, Ministry of Food
Edmund Arthur Trouton, Wounded and Missing Enquiry Department for Ireland, British Red Cross Society
Lady Mary Katherine Turner, President, North Lincolnshire Branch, British Red Cross Society
Arthur Rose Vincent, Chicago Representative, Ministry of Information
Grace Vulliamy, For assistance rendered to British Civilians and Prisoners of War in Holland
Mary Augusta Ward
Lionel Ashton Piers Warner, Deputy General Manager, Mersey Docks and Harbour Board; Director of Ports Branch, Ministry of Shipping
Captain George Francis Warre, Late Head of Motor Boat Department, British Red Cross Society; Donor of Rest House for Nurses, Roquebrune, Riviera
Edith Margaret Watson, Private Secretary to the Chancellor of the Exchequer
Sidney Henry Wells  Director of Civil Employment Bureau, Egyptian Expeditionary Force
John William White, Committee on Production
Henry Goodrich Willett, Secretary, Trinity House
Cecil Mary, Lady Wilson, Founder and Head of the Clothing Branch, Officers' Families Fund
William Francis John Wood  Chairman and Managing Director of The Derby Crown Glass Company, The Rylands Glass and Engineering Company Limited, Wood Bros. Glass Company Limited, etc.
The Honourable Horace Marton Woodhouse, Deputy Assistant Secretary, Ministry of Food
William Henry Plukenett Woodroffe, Director of Road Transport, Labour and Material, Ministry of Food
James Wylie  Department of Procurator-General

British India
Frederick Warner Allum, Engineer-in-Chief, Nushki Extension Railway
Colonel William George Beyts, Army Medical Service, Assistant Director of Medical Services, Bombay Brigade
Victor Hope Boalth, Traffic Manager, North-Western Railway
Lieutenant Charles Stewart Campbell, Indian Army Reserve of Officers, Recruiting Officer, Kirkee, Bombay
Evelyn Roberta, Lady Cardew, Madras
Gertrude Carmichael, Bombay 
Harold Arden Close  Inspector-General of Police, North-West Frontier Province
Anthony Cathcart Coubrough, Indian Munitions Board
Raja Sudhal Deo, Feudatory Chief, Bamra, Bihar and Orissa
Godfrey Charles Denham  Indian Police, Officiating Deputy Director, Central Intelligence
Thomas Archibald Ferrier, Mathematical Instrument Office, Calcutta
James Alexander Ossory Fitzpatrick  Indian Civil Service, Political Agent, Wana, North-West Frontier Province
Henry Harcourt, Indian Civil Service, Deputy Commissioner, Rohtak, Punjab
John Percy Hardiman, Indian Civil Service, Controller of Munitions, Burma
William Falkiner Harnett  Locomotive and Carriage Superintendent, Eastern Bengal State Railway
Edgar Joseph Holberton, Consul for Siam, Burma
Henry Burvill Holmes  Agent, Oudh and Rohilkhund Railway
Nawab Mumtaz-ud-Daula Sir Muhammad Faiyaz Ali Khan  Pahasu, United Provinces
Honorary Captain Nawab Malik Muhammad Mubariz Khan, Tiwana  Shahpur, Punjab
Darcy Lindsay, Secretary, Royal Insurance Company, Calcutta
Miriam Isabel Lyons, President, Poona Women's Branch of the War and Relief Fund, Bombay
Bhupendra Nath Mitra  Controller of War Accounts
Edmund Alexander Molony, Indian Civil Service, Commissioner, Agra Division, United Provinces
Alexander Robertson Murray, Manager, Thomas Duff & Co., Calcutta, Bengal
Lieutenant-Colonel Aubrey John O'Brien  Indian Army, Punjab Commission, Deputy Commissioner, Gujranwala, Punjab
James Peter Orr  Indian Civil Service, Chairman, City Improvement Trust, Bombay
Colonel Charles Marshall Pearce  Indian Defence Force, General Traffic Manager, East Indian Railway, Bengal
David Petrie  Punjab Police (on special duty with Government of India)
Sir John Stanley  Vice-Chairman, Indian Soldiers' Fund
Lieutenant-Colonel Ellacott Leamon Ward, Indian Medical Service, Inspector-General of Prisons, Punjab

Egypt
John Langley, Under-Secretary of State, Ministry of Agriculture
Henry Ward Boys, Assistant Counsel to His Highness the Sultan in the Ministries of the Interior and Justice
Walter Ross-Taylor, Assistant Counsel to His Highness the Sultan in the Ministries of Agriculture, Public Works and War

Sudan
Captain Edward Colpoys Midwinter  General Manager, Sudan Government Railways and Steamers

Officer of the Order of the British Empire (OBE)

Member of the Order of the British Empire (MBE)

Royal Red Cross

First Class (RRC) 
Margaret Alexander  Sister-in-Charge, Civil Hospital Reserve
Kate Hilda Austen, Sister, St. John's Ambulance Brigade
Lavina Badger  Acting Matron, Queen Alexandra's Imperial Military Nursing Service Reserve
Maude Mary Blakely  Acting Principal Matron, Queen Alexandra's Imperial Military Nursing Service
Edith Cornwell  Matron, Army Auxiliary Nursing Service
Elsie Janet Evans  Acting Sister, Civil Hospital Reserve
Emily Vaughan Forrest  Sister-in-Charge, Queen Alexandra's Imperial Military Nursing Service
Maud Louise Francis, Nursing Sister, Canadian Army Medical Corps
Janey Gray, Sister-in-Charge, Territorial Force Nursing Service
Margaret Greig  Acting Sister, Civil Hospital Reserve
Maud Hopton  Acting Matron, Civil Hospital Reserve
Stella May Jenkins, Nursing Sister, Canadian Army Medical Corps
Clara Viola Straatman Johnson  Acting Matron, Queen Alexandra's Imperial Military Nursing Service
Inga Johnson, Acting Matron, Canadian Army Medical Corps
Constance Winifred Jones  Acting Matron, Queen Alexandra's Imperial Military Nursing Service
Mary McLean Loughron, Acting Matron, Queen Alexandra's Imperial Military Nursing Service Reserve
Ellen Martha May, Sister, Territorial Force Nursing Service
Mary Cecil Elizabeth Newman  Acting Matron, Queen Alexandra's Imperial Military Nursing Service
Olive Lucy Niles, Acting Sister, Queen Alexandra's Imperial Military Nursing Service Reserve
Maud Plaskitt  Acting Matron, Queen Alexandra's Imperial Military Nursing Service (retired)
Annie Leonora Plimsaul  Acting Matron, Queen Alexandra's Imperial Military Nursing Service
Louisa Remnant  Acting Sister, Civil Hospital Reserve
Cecilia Ballingall Robb  Sister-in-Charge, Civil Hospital Reserve
Catherine Murray Roy, Sister-in-Charge, Queen Alexandra's Imperial Military Nursing Service
Mary Ellen Ruck  Sister-in-Charge, Territorial Force Nursing Service
Catherine Isabel Scoble  Nursing Sister, Canadian Army Medical Corps
Kathleen Marie Smith  Matron, Territorial Force Nursing Service
Jean Taggart  Sister-in-Charge, Civil Hospital Reserve
Beatrice Jane Tanner, Acting Sister, Queen Alexandra's Imperial Military Nursing Service Reserve
Ada Constance Winifred Teevan  Acting Matron, Queen Alexandra's Imperial Military Nursing Service
Lilian Florence Wheatley, Acting Sister, Civil Hospital Reserve
Martha Whent  Matron, British Red Cross Society
Ada White, Sister-in-Charge, Territorial Force Nursing Service
Isobel Mary Whyte  Acting Matron, Queen Alexandra's Imperial Military Nursing Service
Minnie Wood  Sister in Charge, Queen Alexandra's Imperial Military Nursing Service
Lilian Olmeira Doughty-Wylie  Matron, Limenaria Hospital, Thasos

In recognition of valuable services with the British Forces in Egypt:
Eva Helen Chapman, Head Sister, Australian Army Nursing Service
Rose Creal, Matron, Army Auxiliary Nursing Service
Edith Margaret Davenport, Staff Nurse (Acting Sister), Queen Alexandra's Imperial Military Nursing Service Reserve
Alice Maud Hanrahan, Staff Nurss, Queen Alexandra's Imperial Military Nursing Service Reserve
Helena Jane Mooney, Matron, Egyptian Government Hospital, Suez
Beatrice Sanderson, Staff Nurse (Acting Sister), Territorial Force Nursing Service

In recognition of valuable services with the British Forces in Italy:
Julia Mary Hart, Head Sister, Army Auxiliary Nursing Service
Mary Davidson Woodhouse  Matron, Queen Alexandra's Imperial Military Nursing Service

In recognition of their valuable services with the British Forces in Salonika:
Winifred Maude Bickham, Assist. Matron, Territorial Force Nursing Service
Rose Hannah Black, Sister, Territorial Force Nursing Service
Ida Florence Brooke, Sister, Queen Alexandra's Imperial Military Nursing Service Reserve
Dora Frederica Chapman  Sister, Territorial Force Nursing Service
Helen Muriel Lancashire Cox, Sister, Territorial Force Nursing Service
Lilian Maud Holden, Sister, Territorial Force Nursing Service
Edith Gertrude Kilburn, Sister, Territorial Force Nursing Service
Sara Lewis, Sister, Territorial Force Nursing Service
Alice Marion Prichard, Temp Matron, Army Auxiliary Nursing Service
Adelaide Bertha Russell, Sister, Queen Alexandra's Imperial Military Nursing Service Reserve
Ethelda Runnalls Uren, Matron, Army Auxiliary Nursing Service
Alice Mary Josephine Walpole, Sister, Queen Alexandra's Imperial Military Nursing Service Reserve

Second Class (ARRC) 
Annie Alexander  Sister, British Red Cross Society
Hilda Mary Alford, Staff Nurse, Queen Alexandra's Imperial Military Nursing Service Reserve
Gertrude Jessie Andrews, Temp Head Sister, Army Auxiliary Nursing Service
Mary Arbuthnot, Voluntary Aid Detachment
Ellen Armstrong, Acting Sister, Queen Alexandra's Imperial Military Nursing Service Reserve
Maude Gertrude Atkinson, Sister, New Zealand Army Nursing Service
Edith Aylett, Acting Sister, Queen Alexandra's Imperial Military Nursing Service Reserve
Blanche Baldwin, Nurse, Voluntary Aid Detachment
Annie Barrett, Sister, Territorial Force Nursing Service
Mary Victoria Bean, Acting Sister, Civil Hospital Reserve
Winifred Adela Beausire, Assistant Nurse, Voluntary Aid Detachment
Emily Margaret Vivian Berry, Nurse, Voluntary Aid Detachment
Charlotte Irene Black, Acting Sister, Queen Alexandra's Imperial Military Nursing Service Reserve
Mary Blamire-Brown, Acting Sister, Civil Queen Alexandra's Imperial Military Nursing Service Reserve
Annie Laura Bradley, Nursing Sister, Canadian Hospital Reserve
Dorothy Botting, Queen Alexandra's Imperial Military Nursing Service Reserve Staff Nurse
Annie Black Boyd, Staff Nurse, Army Medical Corps
Florence Broome  Acting Sister, Queen Alexandra's Imperial Military Nursing Service Reserve
Ada Isabella Burton, Acting Sister, Civil Hospital Reserve
Annie Hudkinson Calder, Acting Sister, Civil Hospital Reserve
Lily Calyert, Nursing Sister, Territorial Force Nursing Service
Elizabeth Vera Cameron, Nursing Sister, Canadian Army Medical Corps
Louisa C. Chamberlain, Nursing Sister, Queen Alexandra's Royal Naval Nursing Service, Reserve
Lilian Mary Clieve, Sister-in-Charge, Territorial Force Nursing Service
Mary Emily Colston, Acting Sister, Civil Hospital Reserve
Eileen Love Connolly, Sister, Army Auxiliary Nursing Service
Norah Connolly, Acting Sister, Civil Hospital Reserve
Edith Annie Church Court, Nurse, Voluntary Aid Detachment
Caroline Eddington Crawford, Sister-in-Charge, Queen Alexandra's Imperial Military Nursing Service Reserve
Jessie Cummings, Acting Sister, Queen Alexandra's Imperial Military Nursing Service Reserve
Emily Marion Rosetta Currie, Staff Nurse, South African Medical Nursing Service 
Emma Argyle Cuthbert, Head Sister, Army Auxiliary Nursing Service
Marjorie Hamilton Dalrymple, Nurse, Voluntary Aid Detachment
Charlotte Louise Fitzgerald Dalton, Nurse, Voluntary Aid Detachment
Mary Kathleen Daly, Staff Nurse, Queen Alexandra's Imperial Military Nursing Service Reserve
Ruby Dalzell, Acting Sister, Queen Alexandra's Imperial Military Nursing Service Reserve
Georgina Davidson, Sister, Harvard Unit
Ina Docherty, Matron, General Hospital, Great Yarmouth
Caroline Agnes Donnelly, Nursing Sister, Canadian Army Medical Corps
Ethel Laura Dowling, Charge Sister, British Red Cross Society
Alice Catherine Doyle, Nursing Sister, Canadian Army Medical Corps
Rebecca Draper, Sister, Territorial Force Nursing Service
Rachel, Countess of Dudley  Honorary Lady Superintendent
Helena Elizabeth Dulmage, Matron, Canadian Army Medical Corps
Mary Elizabeth Forrest Earle, Assistant Nurse, Voluntary Aid Detachment
Mary Edgar, Head Sister, London Homoeopathic Hospital, Great Ormond Street
Miss Edwardes, Matron  Convalescent Hospital, Great Malvern
Gladys Lilian Ellis, Nurse, Voluntary Aid Detachment
Nellie Josephine Enright, Nursing Sister, Canadian Army Medical Corps
Mary Ramage Fairbairn, Acting Sister, Civil Hospital Reserve
Marie Ruth Fielding, Sister, Army Auxiliary Nursing Service
Mary Ellen Fisher, Staff Nurse, Army Auxiliary Nursing Service
May Francis, Sister, British Red Cross Society
Alma Ethel May Furniss, Staff Nurse, Army Auxiliary Nursing Service
Ada Baker Gabriel, Acting Sister, Queen Alexandra's Imperial Military Nursing Service Reserve
Caroline Gerrard, Staff Nurse, Civil Hospital
Ada Alice Maude Gibson, Staff Nurse, Territorial Force Nursing Service
Sylvia Mary Glossop, Nurse, Voluntary Aid Detachment
Elizabeth Goold, Acting Sister, Queen Alexandra's Imperial Military Nursing Service Reserve
Edith Wastie Green, Nurse, Voluntary Aid Detachment
Mabel Mary Gregson, Acting Sister, Queen Alexandra's Imperial Military Nursing Service Reserve
Elsie Stewart Greig, Sister, Army Auxiliary Nursing Service
Sybil Anna Grey, Acting Sister, Civil Hospital Reserve
Annie Haigh, Assistant Nurse, Voluntary Aid Detachment
Alice Maud Hall, Acting Sister, Queen Alexandra's Imperial Military Nursing Service Reserve
Susan Hall, Acting Sister, Queen Alexandra's Imperial Military Nursing Service Reserve
Kathleen Agnes Hallett, Charge Sister, British Red Cross Society
Rachel Mary Hamlyn, Assistant Nurse, Voluntary Aid Detachment
Millicent Rutherford-Hams, Nursing Sister, Royal Air Force Hospital, Vendome
Elizabeth Davidson Harper, Acting Sister, Civil Hospital Reserve
Barbara Evelyne Harrison, Sister, Territorial Force Nursing Service
Kate Elizabeth Haywood, Acting Sister, Civil Hospital Reserve
Alice Miriam Hearn, Sister, Territorial Force Nursing Service
Ethel Maud Henbrey, Acting Sister, Queen Alexandra's Imperial Military Nursing Service Reserve
Florence May Hepburn, Acting Sister, Civil Hospital Reserve
Lilian Rosa Hill, Assistant Matron, Territorial Force Nursing Service
Helen Marie Maud Homan, Sister, Army Auxiliary Nursing Service
Annie Graham Horn, Sister, Territorial Force Nursing Service
Blanche Marion Huddleston, Sister, New Zealand Army Nursing Service
Margaret Hughes, Sister, Territorial Force Nursing Service
Sarah Gwendoline Ireland, Acting Sister, Civil Hospital Reserve
Barbara Jeffries, Voluntary Aid Detachment
Elizabeth Jenkin, Sister, Territorial Force Nursing Service
Mabel Georgina Clementine Johnson, Nurse, Voluntary Aid Detachment
Charlotte Edith Jones, Acting Sister, Civil Hospital Reserve
Hannah Jones, Sister, Territorial Force Nursing Service
Harriet Emma Constance Jukes, Nursing Sister, Canadian Army Medical Corps
Lucy Sinton Kelly, Staff Nurse, Queen Alexandra's Imperial Military Nursing Service Reserve
Ethel Kenna, Charge Sister, British Red Cross Society
John Kennard, Voluntary Aid Detachment
Lady Elizabeth Mary Gertrude Keppel, Nurse, Voluntary Aid Detachment
Agnes Margaret Kinnear, Acting Sister, Queen Alexandra's Imperial Military Nursing Service Reserve
May Kirkham, Charge Sister, British Red Cross Society
Ada Mabel Mary Langmaid, Staff Nurse, Queen Alexandra's Imperial Military Nursing Service Reserve
Gwendoline Irene Lardner, Assistant Matron, Queen Alexandra's Imperial Military Nursing Service Reserve
Catherine Jane Lewis, Staff Nurse, Queen Alexandra's Imperial Military Nursing Service Reserve
Mary Haig Lindsay, Sister, Territorial Force Nursing Service
Janet Linton, Sister, Territorial Force Nursing Service
Agnes Maria Lithgow, Acting Sister, Civil Hospital Reserve
Mary Matilda Little, Territorial Force Nursing Service
Lima Gertrude Lovell, Sister, Army Auxiliary Nursing Service
Eva Isobel MacDonald, Staff Nurse, Army Auxiliary Nursing Service
Margaret MacDonald, Nursing Sister, Canadian Army Medical Corps
Sarah Catherine MacIsaac, Matron, Canadian Army Medical Corps
Agnes Gertrude MacMahon, Acting Sister, Queen Alexandra's Imperial Military Nursing Service Reserve
Christina McLeod Macrae, Acting Sister, Queen Alexandra's Imperial Military Nursing Service Reserve
Jessie Buchanan McDonald, Sister, Army Auxiliary Nursing Service
Elizabeth McDougall, Nursing Sister, Canadian Army Medical Corps
Nina McGregor, Nursing Sister, Territorial Force Nursing Service
Anna Bella McLeod, Sister, Territorial Force Nursing Service
Annie Smith McMillan, Sister, Territorial Force Nursing Service
Mary McPherson, Nursing Sister, Canadian Army Medical Corps
Violet May Marsh, Acting Sister, Queen Alexandra's Imperial Military Nursing Service Reserve
Amy Ann Martin, Nursing Sister, Territorial Force Nursing Service
Dora Mason, Acting Sister, Civil Hospital Reserve
Dolores Hope Massy, Nursing Sister, Canadian Army Medical Corps
Mary Jean Mathewson, Sister, Territorial Force Nursing Service
Annie Fisher Mitchell, Nursing Sister, Canadian Army Medical Corps
Annie Linaker Molyneux, Sister, Territorial Force Nursing Service
Florence Annie Morgan, Acting Sister, Civil Hospital Reserve
Ellen Watson Munro, Charge Sister, British Red Cross Society
Annie Henrietta Murray, Sister, St. John's Ambulance Brigade
Kathleen O'Connell, Staff Nurse, Queen Alexandra's Imperial Military Nursing Service Reserve
Catherine O'Connor, Sister, Army Auxiliary Nursing Service
Mary O'Dowd, Acting Sister, Queen Alexandra's Imperial Military Nursing Service Reserve
Gladys Gertrude Parry, Acting Sister, Civil Hospital Reserve
Ethel Theodora Paynter, Nursing Sister, Canadian Army Medical Corps
Gertrude Annie Peters, Nurse, Voluntary Aid Detachment
Margaret Phee, Staff Nurse, Queen Alexandra's Imperial Military Nursing Service Reserve
Catherine Sarah Elizabeth Pierce, Sister, Territorial Force Nursing Service
Edith Pilkington, Acting Sister, Queen Alexandra's Imperial Military Nursing Service Reserve
Helen Mary Porteous, Assistant Matron, Queen Alexandra's Imperial Military Nursing Service Reserve
Winifred Poste, Sister, British Red Cross Society
Isabel Mary Thurlow Prior, Acting Sister, Civil Hospital Reserve
Lucy Rangecroft, Sister, Territorial Force Nursing Service
Gertrude Francis Reid, Nursing Sister, Canadian Army Medical Corps
Katherine Reid, Nursing Sister, Canadian Army Medical Corps
Mabel Hall Reynar, Nursing Sister, Canadian Army Medical Corps
Margaret Sophie Riddell, Matron, British Red Cross Society
Margaret Jane Riddle, Nursing Sister, Canadian Army Medical Corps
Jean Robertson, Sister, Territorial Force Nursing Service
Leah Rosenthal, Acting Sister, Queen Alexandra's Imperial Military Nursing Service Reserve
Rosa Rothwell, Staff Nurse, Queen Alexandra's Imperial Military Nursing Service Reserve
Muriel Gladys Rowe, Acting Sister, Civil Hospital Reserve
Elizabeth Sandford  Assistant Matron, Limenaria Hospital, Thasos
Ethel Shepherd, Assistant Nurse, Voluntary Aid Detachment
Kate Skinner, Sister-in-Charge, Queen Alexandra's Imperial Military Nursing Service Reserve
Edith Lilly Smith, Acting Sister, Queen Alexandra's Imperial Military Nursing Service Reserve
Ethel Smith, Sister, Army Auxiliary Nursing Service
Elizabeth Spensley, Acting Sister, Queen Alexandra's Imperial Military Nursing Service Reserve
Sarah Eleanor Steenson, Acting Sister, Civil Hospital Reserve
Mildred Susanne Stewart, Acting Sister, Civil Hospital Reserve
Constance Adelaide Stone, Sister, Army Auxiliary Nursing Service
Eliza Stones, Acting Sister, Queen Alexandra's Imperial Military Nursing Service Reserve
Isabella Carr Stratton, Sister, Territorial Force Nursing Service
Amy Sarah Stuart, Acting Sister, Queen Alexandra's Imperial Military Nursing Service Reserve
Gladys Kate Thewles, Acting Sister, Civil Hospital Reserve
Blanche Gertrude Thornton, Nursing Sister, South African Medical Nursing Service
Edith lona Tillard, Nurse, Voluntary Aid Detachment
Lilian Mary Trotter, Charge Sister, British Red Cross Society
Ruth Turner, Staff Nurse, Civil Hospital Reserve
Jane Hope Urquhart, Nurse, Voluntary Aid Detachment
Edith Hannah Usher, Nurse, Voluntary Aid Detachment
Hilda Caroline Gwenda Verschoyle, Assistant Nurse. Spec. Probationer
Margaret Walker, Sister, Territorial Force Nursing Service
Una Mary Ward, Assistant Nurse, Voluntary Aid Detachment
Ruby Charlotte Warner, Assistant Nurse, Voluntary Aid Detachment
Ivy Gertrude Waters, Nursing Sister, South African Medical Nursing Service
Christina Mary Watling, Nursing Sister, Canadian Army Medical Corps
Edith Katherine Mercedes Weston, Nurse, Voluntary Aid Detachment
Gladys Laura White, Sister, British Red Cross Society
Edith Catherine Whitlan, Nursing Sister, Canadian Army Medical Corps
Maude Elizabeth Wilkin, Sister, Queen Alexandra's Imperial Military Nursing Service
Nellie Williams, Staff Nurse, Territorial Force Nursing Service
Edith Wood, Sister, Territorial Force Nursing Service
Maude Wright, Nursing Sister, Canadian Army Medical Corps
Margaret Arnott Yule, Sister, Territorial Force Nursing Service
Dora Lund, Nursing Sister, Queen Alexandra's Royal Naval Nursing Service, Reserve
Nance McKay, Nursing Sister, Queen Alexandra's Royal Naval Nursing Service, Reserve
Mabel Rose Chester-Webb, Nursing Sister, Queen Alexandra's Royal Naval Nursing Service, Reserve
Margaret Hunt, Nursing Sister, Queen Alexandra's Royal Naval Nursing Service, Reserve
Lilian Swift, Nursing Sister, Queen Alexandra's Royal Naval Nursing Service, Reserve
Elizabeth Wright Jones, Matron, Monkstown Hospital, Kingstown
Jessie Annie Mortlock, Matron, Brooksby Hospital, Leicestershire

In recognition of valuable services with the British Forces in Egypt:
Jane Bell, Sister, Territorial Force Nursing Service
Louise Bennett, Assistant Matron, Queen Alexandra's Imperial Military Nursing Service Reserve
Emily Bishop, Sister, Queen Alexandra's Imperial Military Nursing Service Reserve
Elizabeth Brown, Staff Nurse, Queen Alexandra's Imperial Military Nursing Service Reserve
Grace Helena Burns, Sister, Army Auxiliary Nursing Service
Ruby Thomson Cameron, Staff Nurse, Queen Alexandra's Imperial Military Nursing Service Reserve
Annie Edith Cheetham, Nurse, Voluntary Aid Detachment
Mary Clayden, Sister, Queen Alexandra's Imperial Military Nursing Service Reserve
Benigna Coffey, Sister, Queen Alexandra's Imperial Military Nursing Service Reserve
Margaret Coombes, Nurse, Voluntary Aid Detachment
Sarah Annie Cowell, Sister, Queen Alexandra's Imperial Military Nursing Service Reserve
Katherine Mary Duckworth, Nurse, Voluntary Aid Detachment
Matilda Fleming, Sister, Queen Alexandra's Imperial Military Nursing Service Reserve
Louisa Fox, Sister, Queen Alexandra's Imperial Military Nursing Service Reserve
Isabel Jackson, Sister, Queen Alexandra's Imperial Military Nursing Service Reserve
Laura Lamonby, Nurse, Voluntary Aid Detachment
Alma Louise Lee, Sister, Queen Alexandra's Imperial Military Nursing Service Reserve
Janetta Thornton Leechman, Sister, Queen Alexandra's Imperial Military Nursing Service Reserve
Isabel Montford, Nurse, Voluntary Aid Detachment
Elsie Louise Moseley, Nurse, Voluntary Aid Detachment
Mary Eveline Nicholson, Sister, Army Auxiliary Nursing Service
Mary Scanlan, Sister, Queen Alexandra's Imperial Military Nursing Service Reserve
Winifred Merlina Scott, Sister, Army Auxiliary Nursing Service
Elizabeth Douglas Simson, Sister, Queen Alexandra's Imperial Military Nursing Service Reserve
Maud Antrobus Wardlaw, Matron, Egyptian Government Hospital, Alexandria
Annie Weir, Sister, Territorial Force Nursing Service
Cecil Witherington, Assistant Matron, Queen Alexandra's Imperial Military Nursing Service Reserve
Margaret Woods, Head Sister, Army Auxiliary Nursing Service

In recognition of valuable services with the British Forces in Italy:
Edith Doris Altham, Sister, Queen Alexandra's Imperial Military Nursing Service Reserve
Helena Lucy Davies, Sister, Queen Alexandra's Imperial Military Nursing Service Reserve
Lily Mackenzie, Staff Nurse, Army Auxiliary Nursing Service
Grace McPherson, Sister, Territorial Force Nursing Service
Mary Jane Powell, Sister, Queen Alexandra's Imperial Military Nursing Service Reserve

In recognition of their valuable services with the British Forces in Salonika:
Portia Mary Lewis Batley, Staff Nurse, Territorial Force Nursing Service
Jessie Macdonald Baxter, Sister, Army Auxiliary Nursing Service
Ada Mary Bennett, Staff Nurse, Territorial Force Nursing Service
Gladys Marguerite Bowes, Nurse, Voluntary Aid Detachment, British Red Cross Society
Florence Bertha Bussell, Sister, Queen Alexandra's Imperial Military Nursing Service Reserve
Beatrice Mary Chadwick, Staff Nurse, Territorial Force Nursing Service
Agnes Divine, Sister, Territorial Force Nursing Service
Natalie Theodora Dodd, Nurse, Voluntary Aid Detachment, St. John's Ambulance Brigade
Elizabeth Helen Draper, Sister, Army Auxiliary Nursing Service
Adelaide Jenkins Eves, Sister, Queen Alexandra's Imperial Military Nursing Service Reserve
Loretta Johanna Fogarty, Sister, Queen Alexandra's Imperial Military Nursing Service Reserve
Hilda Mary Gerrard, Nurse, Voluntary Aid Detachment
Ethel Mary Ann Giddings, Sister, Army Auxiliary Nursing Service
Susannah Haig, Sister, Queen Alexandra's Imperial Military Nursing Service Reserve
Minnie Hartley, Sister, Queen Alexandra's Imperial Military Nursing Service Reserve
Lizzie Richardson Henderson, Staff Nurse, Queen Alexandra's Imperial Military Nursing Service Reserve
Florence Jackson, Sister, Queen Alexandra's Imperial Military Nursing Service Reserve
Gladys Webster Jarrett, Staff Nurse, Army Auxiliary Nursing Service
Deborah Anne Ladbrook, Sister, Territorial Force Nursing Service
Harriet Pears Lauder, Sister, Territorial Force Nursing Service
Rosina McClure MacMorland, Sister, Queen Alexandra's Imperial Military Nursing Service Reserve
Marion Russell McMillan, Sister, Territorial Force Nursing Service
Ethel May Meade, Staff Nurse, Army Auxiliary Nursing Service
Minnie Victoria Mears, Sister, Army Auxiliary Nursing Service
Nona Molson, Superintendent, Voluntary Aid Detachment, British Red Cross Society
Margaret Moody, Sister, Territorial Force Nursing Service
Christabel Ada Nekrews, Staff Nurse, Queen Alexandra's Imperial Military Nursing Service Reserve
Ethel Blanche Philps, Staff Nurse, Territorial Force Nursing Service
Gertrude Pugh, Staff Nurse, Territorial Force Nursing Service
Helen Mary Ripper, Sister, Queen Alexandra's Imperial Military Nursing Service Reserve
Nellie Roberts, Sister, Queen Alexandra's Imperial Military Nursing Service Reserve
Lilian Jane Rutherford, Staff Nurse, Army Auxiliary Nursing Service
Jessie Dow Scott, Sister, Queen Alexandra's Imperial Military Nursing Service Reserve
Theresa Frances Sephton, Sister, Queen Alexandra's Imperial Military Nursing Service Reserve
Ethel Jeannette Softer, Sister, Army Auxiliary Nursing Service
Adela Stones, Sister, Queen Alexandra's Imperial Military Nursing Service Reserve
Dorothy Elizabeth Taylor, Staff Nurse, Queen Alexandra's Imperial Military Nursing Service Reserve
Isabella Thomson, Sister, Queen Alexandra's Imperial Military Nursing Service Reserve
Mary Anable Walker, Staff Nurse, Territorial Force Nursing Service
Selina Elizabeth Bellona Watkins, Sister, Territorial Force Nursing Service
Annie Elizabeth West, Staff Nurse, Army Auxiliary Nursing Service
May Florence Young, Sister, Army Auxiliary Nursing Service

Awarded a Bar to the Royal Red Cross (RRC*) 
Annie Warren Gill  Lady Superintendent of Nurses, Royal Infirmary, Edinburgh
Helena Hartigan  Acting Principal Matron, Queen Alexandra's Imperial Military Nursing Service
Gertrude Mary Smith  Acting Matron, Queen Alexandra's Imperial Military Nursing Service
Catherine Geddes Stronach  Acting Principal Matron, Queen Alexandra's Imperial Military Nursing Service
Mabel Mary Tunley  Acting Principal Matron, Queen Alexandra's Imperial Military Nursing Service

In recognition of valuable services with the British Forces in Egypt:
Janet Erskine Dods  Matron, Queen Alexandra's Imperial Military Nursing Service
Daisy Millicent Catherine Michell  Sister, Queen Alexandra's Imperial Military Nursing Service
Marie Elsbeth Neville  Sister, Queen Alexandra's Imperial Military Nursing Service
Agnes Weir  Sister, Queen Alexandra's Imperial Military Nursing Service

Kaisar-i-Hind Medal 
First Class
Sarah Isabel Hatch, Canadian Baptist Telugu Mission, Madras
Mahomedbhoy Currimbhoy, Merchant, Bombay
Pandita Ramabai, Bombay, Alfred Donald Pickford, Begg, Dunlop & Company, Calcutta, Bengal
Lala Mul Chand Thakral, Multan, Punjab
Amedee George Du Bern, Managing Partner, D. Bern and Company, Burma
Gertrude Davis, Principal Matron, Australian Army Nursing Service, Victoria War Hospital, Bombay
John Dodds Price, Officiating Civil Surgeon, Nowgong, Assam

Medal of the Order of the British Empire

Military Division 
For services in connection with the War.
2nd Mate Neil Campbell
Chief Writer Bernard Higgins, Royal Naval Volunteer Reserve
3rd Writer Sidney Edward Illman
Fireman Arthur James Knubley, M.M.R
Chief Writer Stanley George Hoare Leyh

Distinguished Service Order (DSO) 

Vice-Admiral Godfrey Harry Brydges Mundy 
Rear-Admiral Charles William Keighly-Peach
Commander Frederic Giffard  
Commander Charles Frederic Roy Cowan  
Lieutenant-Commander Charles Tiedmann Gervers  
Lieutenant-Commander Cyril Goolden  
Lieutenant-Commander Rowland Kyrle Cecil Pope  
Surgeon Lieutenant-Commander Henry Dennis Drennan 
Major Robert Jackson Adams, Royal Horse and Royal Field Artillery, attd. 331st (East Lancaster) Brigade, Royal Field Artillery
Major James Agnew, 1/5th Battalion, Argyll and Sutherland Highlanders
Captain Alexander Claud Allan  Cameron Highlanders
Temp Captain Albert George Allen  General List
Major and Brevet Lieutenant-Colonel Reginald Seymour Allen, Hampshire Regiment
Captain John Angell  Dorsetshire Regiment and Machine Gun Corps
Major and Brevet Lieutenant-Colonel Edgar Carnegie Anstey, Royal Artillery
Temp Major Alec Hutchinson Ashcroft, 7th Battalion, South Staffordshire Regiment
Captain Richard Romer Claude Baggallay  1st Battalion, Irish Guards
Captain Charles Lane Bagnall  9th Battalion, Durham Light Infantry, attd. 50th Divisional Signals Company, Royal Engineers
Temp Major James Yescombe Baldwin, Army Cyclist Corps
Major George Richard Balston, Royal Field Artillery, attd. 92nd Brigade, Royal Field Artillery
Captain James Barkley, Royal Army Medical Corps, attd. 2/3rd (Home Counties) Field Ambulance, Royal Army Medical Corps
Major John Frederick Barrington, Royal Garrison Artillery, attd. Headquarters, 71st Brigade, Royal Garrison Artillery
Major Arthur Frederick Bayley, Royal Artillery, attd. 307th (South Midland) Brigade, Royal Field Artillery
Temp Captain James Arthur Bennewith, 8th Battalion, Tank Corps
Major Hubert Lyle Bingay, Royal Engineers
Captain and Brevet Major Frederic William Lyon Bissett  Duke of Cornwall's Light Infantry
Lieutenant Archie Vyvyan Board  Essex Regiment and Machine Gun Corps
Captain Herbert William Bolton, Royal West Surrey Regiment
Captain Edward de Winton Herbert Bradley  2nd Battalion, Yorkshire Light Infantry
Captain William Picton Bradley-Williams, 2nd Battalion, Yorkshire Light Infantry, attd. 5th Battalion, Border Regiment
Temp Captain George Bradstock  407th Battery, 96th Brigade, Royal Field Artillery
Major Henry Russell Brancker, 87th Brigade, Royal Garrison Artillery
Temp Major Geoffrey Armstrong Buddie  86th Field Company, Royal Engineers
Captain Sidney Waterfield Bunker  Royal Fusiliers, employed Spec. Brigade, Royal Engineers
Temp Major James Charles Burdett  6th Battalion, Leicestershire Regiment
Captain Robert Burgess  Royal Army Medical Corps, attd. 24th (1/1st Wessex) Field Ambulance
Major William Mahony Butler, King Edward's Horse and 12th Battalion, Tank Corps
Major Alexander Callam  Royal Army Medical Corps, attd. 1/1st (East Lancaster) Field Ambulance
Captain James Olpherts Campbell  B/88th Brigade, Royal Field Artillery
Temp Major Alfred Edward Carr  1st Field Company, Tank Corps
Captain Bertram Abbott Carr, Royal Garrison Artillery, attd. 170th Siege Battery, Royal Garrison Artillery
Captain Cyril Rodney Carter, 1st Battalion, Royal Lancaster Regiment
Captain and Brevet Major Francis George Chalmer  Royal Highlanders, attd. 9th Battalion, Machine Gun Corps
Temp Captain Randolph Arthur Chell  General List
Temp Captain Peter Temple Chevallier  General List
Temp Captain James Archibald Church  251st Tunneling Company, Royal Engineers
Temp Captain Charles Willoughby Clark  Tank Corps
Temp Captain Percy William Clark  Royal Engineers
Temp Lieutenant Wilfrid Bairstow Clarkson, 141st Siege Battery, Royal Garrison Artillery
Temp Major Hamilton Clendining, 10th Battalion, attd. 22nd Battalion, Royal Irish Rifles
Captain Eric Charles Clifford  Royal Field Artillery, attd. C/150th Battery, Royal Field Artillery
Captain Hugh Murchison Clowes, 14th Battalion, London Regiment
Captain Lee Danby Buxton Cogan, 88th Field Ambulance, Royal Army Medical Corps
Major Francis Lane Congreve  Royal Field Artillery Headquarters, 155th A. Brigade, Royal Field Artillery
Temp Captain Frederick Charles Cook  209th Field Company, Royal Engineers
Temp Captain John Campbell Cooke  General List
Temp Lieutenant Arthur George Coombs, 113th Siege Battery, Royal Garrison Artillery
Lieutenant-Colonel William Francis Taylor Corrie, Royal Garrison Artillery Headquarters, 69th Brigade
Major Lannoy John Coussmaker  Royal Engineers (T.P.)
Major Edward Harvie Cox  2/3rd (East Lancaster) Field Ambulance, Royal Army Medical Corps
Temp Captain Ian Cairns Cowan  General List
Major diaries Joseph Edmonstoune Cranstoun, 1/1st Lanarkshire Yeomanry, attd. 6th Battalion, Gordon Highlanders
Major Frederick William Beresford Cripps, Gloucestershire Hussars Yeomanry
Temp Major Desmond Warwick Croft  South Wales Borderers, late 5th Battalion
Major and Brevet Lieutenant-Colonel Arthur Crookenden, Cheshire Regiment
Major Denis Daly  Royal Garrison Artillery, attd. 17th Brigade, Royal Field Artillery
Temp Major Henry William Gifford Dansey, General List
Captain Francis Henry Norman Davidson  Royal Field Artillery
Lieutenant James Onslow Kingsmill Delap, Royal Garrison Artillery, attd. 303rd Siege Battery, Royal Garrison Artillery
Captain John Finlay Dew  Scottish Rifles
Major Vincent Hamilton Dickson, C/330th Brigade (East Lancaster), Royal Field Artillery
Captain Wadham Heathcote Diggle  Coldstream Guards
Captain John Marsh Diggles  6th Battalion, Cheshire Regiment
Captain Francis George Dobson  Royal Army Medical Corps, attd. 1/2nd (West Riding) Field Ambulance
Temp Lieutenant-Colonel Robert Cooper Drury, Royal Field Artillery, attd. 50th (Nbrn) Divisional Artillery Column, Royal Field Artillery
Lieutenant-Colonel Arthur Dugdale  Oxfordshire Hussars Yeomanry
Major William McCombie Duguid-McCombie, 2nd Dragoons
Captain and Brevet Major Jesse Pevensey Duke  Royal Warwickshire Regiment
Captain Thomas Ingram Dun  Royal Army Medical Corps
Captain and Brevet Major William Edmonstone Duncan  Royal Field Artillery
Captain Charles William Eames  Royal Army Medical Corps, attd. 2/2nd (West Riding) Field Ambulance
Major Clive Thornley Edmunds, 57th Field Ambulance, Royal Army Medical Corps
Temp Major Cyril Ernest Edwards  26th Battalion, Royal Fusiliers
Lieutenant William John Eldridge  90th Siege Battery, Royal Garrison Artillery
Lieutenant-Colonel John Evans, 1/2nd Battalion, Monmouthshire Regiment
Major Charles Julius Everard, 60th Siege Battery, Royal Garrison Artillery
Major Henry Nevill Fairbank  attd. 174th Brigade, Royal Field Artillery
Temp Major Arthur Edward Bruce Fielding, 63rd Field Company, Royal Engineers
Temp Major Edwin Finn, 21st Battalion, West Yorkshire Regiment
Major John Lachlan Forbes  16th Siege Battery, Royal Garrison Artillery
Major William Henry Forsyth  38th Field Ambulance, Royal Army Medical Corps
Captain and Brevet Major Gerald Ian Gartlan  Royal Irish Rifles
Major Lionel Gascoigne, B/170th Brigade, Royal Field Artillery
Captain Gerard Edward James Gent  3rd Battalion, Duke of Cornwall's Light Infantry, attd. 1st Battalion
Major Ewen Grant, Lovat's Scouts Yeomanry
Lieutenant-Colonel Charles Lloyd Rashleigh Gray, 63rd Brigade, Royal Garrison Artillery
Captain William Edmund Gray  Rifle Brigade and Machine Gun Corps
Major Mancha Gregory  Royal Field Artillery
Captain Cyril James Anthony Griffin  Royal Army Medical Corps, attd. 5th Cavalry Field Ambulance
Captain Paul Gottlieb Julius Gnterbock  4th Battalion, Gloucestershire Regiment
Captain Arthur Leslie Harman  B Battery, 110th Brigade, Royal Field Artillery
Temp Major John Cabourn Hartley, 4th Battalion, Royal Fusiliers
Major Wilfred Percy Ashby Hattersley-Smith, 288th Siege Battery, Royal Garrison Artillery
Lieutenant Hugh Douglas Hawkins, Royal Garrison Artillery, attd. 431st Siege Battery
Major Norman Canning, Healing  Royal Garrison Artillery
Captain Cyril Helm  42nd Field Ambulance, Royal Army Medical Corps
Major Neville George Bodleau Henderson, Royal Highlanders
Captain John Victor Hermon, Cheshire Yeomanry, attd. 6th Dragoon Guards
Lieutenant-Colonel Henry Heywood Heywood-Lonsdale, Shropshire Yeomanry
Major John Pemberton Heywood Heywood-Lonsdale, Shropshire Yeomanry, attd. 10th Battalion, Shropshire Light Infantry
Lieutenant William Edward Hicks  152nd Heavy Battery, Royal Garrison Artillery
Major Lionel Henry Hickson, Royal West Kent Regiment
Major Rowley Richard Hill, 58th A. Brigade, Royal Garrison Artillery
Captain and Brevet Major Edward Norman Fortescue Hitchins  West Riding Regiment, attd. 41st Divisional Signals Company, Royal Engineers
Captain and Brevet Major James Wilfred Lang Stanley Hobart  North Staffordshire Regiment
Lieutenant John William Hoggart  C/50th Brigade, Royal Field Artillery
Temp Major Hugh Moritz Holland, Royal Garrison Artillery, attd. Headquarters, III Corps
Captain Lord Hans Wellesley Holmpatrick  16th Lancers
Temp Major Ernest Eric Ferris Home  Royal Engineers
Temp Captain Percy Frederick Hone  General List, attd. 21st Battalion, Middlesex Regiment
Major Maurice Henry Neville House, C Battery, 56th Brigade, Royal Field Artillery
Captain Sidney Howes  21st Lancers
Lieutenant-Colonel Arthur Bennison Hubback  20th Battalion, London Regiment
Major Kenneth Hunnybun, Army Cyclist Corps, attd. 7th Battalion, Somerset Light Infantry
Major Cecil Jordan Ingleby, 4th Battalion, East Yorkshire Regiment
Temp Lieutenant Joseph Boyd Irwin  1st Battalion, Royal Lancaster Regiment, attd. 12th Trench Mortar Battery
Captain Reginald Neville Jackson, General List, attd. British Mission, French General Headquarters
Lieutenant-Colonel Frederick William Jarvis, Suffolk Yeomanry
Temp Captain George Francis Johnston  180th Tunneling Company, Royal Engineers
Temp Lieutenant-Colonel d'Arcy Hemsworth Kay, 21st Battalion, Machine Gun Corps
Captain David Robert Keir, 7th Battalion, Royal Highlanders,
Lieutenant-Colonel Harry Joseph Kelsall, Royal Garrison Artillery, 12th Brigade
Major Henry Maule Kemble, 45th Siege Battery, Royal Garrison Artillery
Lieutenant James Benjamin Kindersley  Royal Field Artillery
Temp Lieutenant-Colonel Walter Diarmid Vere Oldham King, 17th Battalion, Northumberland Fusiliers
Temp Captain Alexander Edmond Knight  Royal Army Medical Corps
Temp Lieutenant Reginald Coldham Knight  5th Brigade Headquarters, Tank Corps
Captain Neville Ogilvie Laing, 4th Hussars
Lieutenant James Lamond  2nd Battalion, Royal Scots, attd. 1/5th Battalion, South Staffordshire Regiment
Captain Charles Llewellyn Lander  Royal Army Medical Corps, attd. 2/3rd (S.M.) Field Ambulance, Royal Army Medical Corps
Captain and Brevet Major Thomas Joseph Leahy  Royal Dublin Fusiliers
Lieutenant-Colonel Edward Carey le Pelley, Royal Garrison Artillery
Lieutenant John Leslie  12th Lancers, attd. 6th Battalion, Tank Corps
Captain Hugh Liddell  1/7th Battalion, Northumberland Fusiliers
Major Robert Walton Ling  Royal Horse and Royal Field Artillery
Major and Brevet Lieutenant-Colonel Granville George Loch  Royal Scots
Major John Fleming King Lockhart, Royal Field Artillery, attd. 312th (West Riding) Brigade, Royal Field Artillery
Major Stuart Gerald McAllum  Royal Army Medical Corps, attd. 140th Field Ambulance
Captain Herbert Rochfort McCullagh, 2nd Battalion, Durham Light Infantry, attd. 19th Battalion
Captain and Brevet Major Alastair Ian MacDougall  5th Lancers
Captain Kenneth Ian McIver  135th Siege Battery, Royal Garrison Artillery
Temp Captain Daniel MacKay  C/165th Brigade, Royal Field Artillery
Captain and Brevet Major Lionel de Amarel Mackenzie  Gordon Highlanders
Major Robert Harman Mackenzie  Royal Engineers
Lieutenant-Colonel Farquhar McLennan  Royal Army Medical Corps
Captain John MacMillan  Royal Army Medical Corps, attd. 5th (London) Field Ambulance, Royal Army Medical Corps
Captain Stuart Logan MacWatt  163rd Siege Battery, Royal Garrison Artillery
Captain Bernard Oswald March  Royal Field Artillery, attd. 158th A. Brigade
Captain Gordon Spencer Marston  Royal Engineers, attd. 234th Field Company, Royal Engineers
Major Jeffery Eardley Marston  Royal Artillery
Temp Lieutenant-Colonel Charles Roswell Martin, 20th (S.) Battalion3 King's Royal Rifle Corps (Pioneers)
Temp Major James Godfrey Martin  8th Battalion, North Staffordshire Regiment
Temp Captain Herbert Marsh Sims Meares  55th Field Company, Royal Engineers
Temp Captain Leslie Woodfield Mellonie  116th Heavy Battery, Royal Garrison Artillery
Major William Rice Meredith, Royal Inniskilling Fusiliers
Lieutenant Thomas Merrick  attd. 87th Brigade, Royal Field Artillery
Temp Major Charles Micklem, Royal Marine Artillery, No. 2 Howitzer
Major George Ralph Miller, 23rd Brigade, Royal Field Artillery
Captain Christopher Carroll Mitchell  B/47th Brigade, Royal Field Artillery
Captain Charles Willoughby Moke Norrie  11th Hussars
Captain and Brevet Major Crawford Victor Monier-Williams  York & Lancaster Regiment, secd, Royal Engineers Signal Service
Major Archibald Digby Murray, Royal Garrison Artillery
Captain Philip Stafford Myburgh  A. Battery, 152nd Brigade, Royal Field Artillery
Temp Captain Geoffrey Gay Nanson  3rd Siege Battery, Royal Garrison Artillery
Captain George Travers Nugee  88th Battery 14th Brigade, Royal Field Artillery
Captain Maurice Sarsfield Ormrod, 11th Battalion, King's Royal Rifle Corps
Captain Charles Max Page  Royal Army Medical Corps, attd. 90th Field Ambulance
Temp Captain Montgomery Paterson Paton  Royal Army Medical Corps
Temp Major John William Balfour Paul, 18th Group Headquarters, Labour Corps
Lieutenant-Colonel Wilfrid Evelyn Peal, Royal Field Artillery, attd. 123rd Brigade, Royal Field Artillery
Captain Bertram Harris Hill Perry  Royal Scots, attd. 8th Battalion, Royal Lancaster Regiment
Temp Major Arthur Edward Phillips, 7th Battalion, Royal West Kent Regiment
Temp Captain Frank Phillips  General List
Captain William Eric Phillips  Leinster Regiment, attd. 2/6th Battalion, Royal Warwickshire Regiment
Lieutenant Constantino James Phipps  Liverpool Regiment, attd. Army Signal Service
2nd Lieutenant Stephen Harvey Piper, 9th Battalion, Nottinghamshire and Derbyshire Regiment
Temp Major William Pollock, 465th Battery, 65th Brigade, Royal Field Artillery
Captain and Brevet Major Sir Edward Hulton Preston  Royal Sussex Regiment
Captain John Talbot Wentworth Reeve, Rifle Brigade, and Machine Gun Corps
Temp Major Alan Reid-Kellett  South Wales Borderers, attd. 6th Battalion
Major John Galloway Riddick, Royal Engineers
Captain James Robert Robertson, Bedfordshire Regiment
Major Thomas Trevor Hull Robinson  Royal Army Medical Corps, No. 5 Field Ambulance
Major John Cowley Robson, Royal Field Artillery, attd. D. Battery, 52nd A. Brigade
Temp Captain Vivian Barry Rogers  General List
Major Alistair Richard Roney-Dougal  Royal Artillery
Temp Major George Francis Rothschild  12th Battalion, Royal Sussex Regiment, attd. 2/10th Battalion, London Regiment
Major Richard Herbert Rowe  Royal Garrison Artillery
Temp Major Reginald Herbert Rowland, 8th Battalion, Royal West Surrey Regiment
Captain Humphrey Sayer  Sussex Yeomanry
Major Angus James Percy Scaife, Royal Garrison Artillery, 187th Siege Battery
Captain Alexander Scott  1/7th Battalion, Argyll and Sutherland Highlanders
Major Albert Harold Seagrim, Leinster Regiment, attd. 19th Battalion, Highland Light Infantry
Major Raymond Morton Shaw  Royal Field Artillery, attd. 246th (West Riding) Brigade
Major George Edward Smart, Royal Garrison Artillery, 351st Siege Battery
Major James Habersham Speeding, Royal Garrison Artillery, attd. 283rd Siege Battery
Temp Captain Michael Spencer-Smith  General List, attd. Canadian Corps Horse Artillery
Major and Brevet Lieutenant-Colonel Wilfrid Bliss Spender  Royal Garrison Artillery
Major John Hector Stephen, 89th (Highland) 1/1st Field Ambulance, Royal Army Medical Corps
Captain Alexander John Stephenson-Fetherstonhaugh  Worcestershire Regiment
Captain Charles Selby Stirling-Cookson  King's Own Scottish Borderers
Temp Major George Moore Stockings, 12th Battalion, Yorkshire Light Infantry
Major Maiden Augustus Studd  B/156th Brigade, Royal Field Artillery
Captain and Brevet Major William Moxhay Sutton  Somerset Light Infantry
Captain and Brevet Major Oliver Sutton-Nelthorpe  Rifle Brigade
Temp Captain Robert Svensson  Royal Army Medical Corps, 102nd Field Ambulance
Cap Arthur Wignall Tate, Royal Highlanders, attd. 41st Battalion, Machine Gun Corps
Captain and Brevet Major Alexander Patrick Drummond Telfer-Smollett  Highland Light Infantry
Lieutenant-Colonel Edward Gordon Thin, 10th Battalion, Liverpool Regiment
Major Robert Henry Thomas, Royal Engineers
Temp Major Stanley Ford Thomas, 6th Battalion, Shropshire Light Infantry
Temp Captain Alan Chichester Thornson, Royal Engineers
Temp Major George Thomson, 12th Battalion, Royal Irish Rifles
Captain Hugh Charles Napier Trollope  2nd Battalion, Suffolk Regiment
Major Arthur Owen Vaughan, Labour Corps
Lieutenant Frederic Campbell Wallace  Royal Irish Rifles
Temp Lieutenant Neville Wakefield, Royal Field Artillery, attd. G. A.A. Battery
Lieutenant Alsager Warburton  1/6th Battalion, Liverpool Regiment
Major William Miles Moss O'Donnell Welsh  C/106th Brigade, Royal Field Artillery
Major Harold Graham Wilson, 1/5th Battalion, Lincolnshire Regiment
Captain Francis William Wilson-Fitzgerald  1st Royal Dragoons
Captain Wilfrid Ormonde Winter, No. 5 Railway Survey and Recon. Section, Royal Engineers
Temp Captain Arthur Graham Woods  2nd Brigade, Tank Corps
Major Philip Gerald Yorke, Royal Artillery
Captain James Young  1/3rd (Lowland) Field Ambulance, Royal Army Medical Corps
Major Jack Annand Cunningham 
Captain Francis Joseph Edward Feeney
Lieutenant-Colonel Francis Esmé Theodore Hewlett 
Captain Arthur Frederick Foy Jacob
Lieutenant-Colonel Arthur Murray Longmore
Major Trafford Leigh Mallory
Lieutenant-Colonel Hugh Mowbray Meyler 
Colonel Duncan le Geyt Pitcher 
Major George Ronald MacFarlane Reid 
Lieutenant-Colonel Helperus Andrias Van Ryneveld 

Canadian Force
Major Florent Georges Arnold, Canadian Army Service Corps
Major John Beswick Bailey, 54th Battalion, Canadian Infantry
Major Roderick Ogle Bell-Irving  16th Battalion, Canadian Infantry
Major Arthur Hardie Bick, Canadian Field Artillery
Major Beverly W. Browne  16th Battalion, Canadian Infantry
Major William James Gordon Burns, 32nd Battery, 8th Brigade, Canadian Field Artillery
Colonel Royal Burritt, Manitoba Regiment
Major David James Corrigall  1st Central Ontario Regiment
Captain Selkirk George Currie  Princess Patricia's Canadian Light Infantry
Major John Carnegy de Balinhard, Saskatchewan Regiment
Major Wallace Hugh Dobbie, 1st Siege Battery, Canadian G. Artillery
Brigadier-General William Okell Holden Dodds  Canadian Field Artillery
Major Alexander Stuart Donald, 20th Battery, 5th Brigade, Canadian Field Artillery
Major Andrew Eastman Duncanson, 123rd Battalion, Canadian Infantry
Major Philip Earnshaw  1st Canadian Divisional Signals Company, Canadian Engineers
Major Ernest Flexman, D/22nd Battery, 6th Brigade, Canadian Field Artillery
Major John Fortescue Foulkes, Canadian General List
Major Daniel William Fraser, 6th Battalion, Canadian Railway Troops
Lieutenant-Colonel Albert Coleman Garner, 12th Battalion, Canadian Railway Troops
Major Elliot Anson Greene, 61st Battery, 14th Brigade, Canadian Field Artillery
Major Robert Dickson Harkness  1st Motor Machine Gun Brigade, Machine Gun Corps
Major Patrick Hennessy  Canadian Army Service Corps
Major Arthur Hibbert  3rd Canadian Tunneling Company, Canadian Engineers
Lieutenant-Colonel John Houliston, Canadian Engineers
Major Norman Holliday Macaulay, Canadian Field Artillery
Lieutenant-Colonel Walter Adam McConnell, 10th Battalion, Canadian Railway Troops
Major Cuthbert Finnie McEwan, Canadian Light Horse
Lieutenant-Colonel Walter Norwood Moorhouse, 3rd Battalion, Canadian Machine Gun Corps
Major John Alexander McIntosh, 18th Battalion, Canadian Infantry
Major James Ivan McSloy, 4th Brigade, Canadian Field Artillery
Temp Lieutenant-Colonel Allan Angus Magee, Quebec Regiment
Major Harry Frederick Victor Mearling  2nd Motor Machine Gun Brigade, Canadian Machine Gun Corps
Major Ernest Russell Morris, 1st Battalion, Canadian Machine Gun Corps
Lieutenant-Colonel William Aird Munro, 11th Battalion, Canadian Railway Troops
Quartermaster and Major Edward Albert Oliver, 38th Battalion, Canadian Infantry
Major Leonard Cecil Outerbridge, 75th Battalion, Canadian Infantry
Major Frederick Ross Phelan  87th Battalion, Canadian Infantry
Major Francis Arthur Robertson, 12th Siege Battery, Canadian Garrison Artillery
Major Robert Porteous Saunders  19th Battalion, Canadian Infantry
Major Kenneth Stuart  7th Battalion, Canadian Engineers
Temp Major William George Swan, 2nd Battalion, Canadian Railway Troops
Major Edward Vivian Thompson, 33rd Battery, 9th Brigade, Canadian Field Artillery
Temp Lieutenant-Colonel Charles Walter Vipond, 9th Field Ambulance, Canadian Army Medical Corps
Major William Basil Wedd  1st Central Ontario Regiment
Major Henry Willis O'Connor, East Ontario Regiment
Major James Henry Wood, 2nd Field Ambulance, Canadian Army Medical Corps
Lieutenant-Colonel James Gordon Weir  2nd Battalion, Canadian Machine Gun Corps

Australian Imperial Force
Lieutenant-Colonel Walter William Alderman  Australian Imperial Force, attd. 1st Battalion, Auckland Regiment, New Zealand Forces
Major James Sinclair Standish Anderson  58th Battalion, secd. 3rd Australian Infantry Brigade Headquarters
Major Frank Horton Berryman, 5th A. Brigade, Australian Field Artillery
Major Harry Charles Bundock, 36th Australian Heavy Artillery Brigade
Major Henry Gervais Lovett Cameron  56th Battalion, Australian Imperial Force
Major Eric Campbell, 12th A. Brigade, Australian Field Artillery
Major Reginald Blakeney Carr, 13th Field Company, Australian Engineers
Lieutenant-Colonel Roy William Chambers, 11th Field Ambulance, Australian Army Medical Corps
Major Cyril Albert Clowes  Australian Field Artillery
Major Hugh John Connell  35th Battalion, Australian Imperial Force
Lieutenant-Colonel William Edward Lodewyk Hamilton Crowther, 5th Field Ambulance, Australian Army Medical Corps
Major Edward John Dibdin, 42nd Battalion, Australian Imperial Force
Lieutenant-Colonel John Farrell, 43rd Battalion, Australian Imperial Force
Major Arthur William Hutchin, General List
Major John Morphett Irwin, 7th Brigade, Australian Field Artillery
Major Joseph Edward Lee  45th Battalion, Australian Imperial Force
Major Edmund Frank Lind, 2nd Field Ambulance, Australian Army Medical Corps
Major Eyrl George Lister, 13th Brigade, Australian Field Artillery
Major Robert Arthur Little, 1st Brigade, Australian Field Artillery
Lieutenant-Colonel George-William Macartney, 10th Field Ambulance, Australian Army Medical Corps
Major John James Lawton McCall, 20th Battalion, Australian Imperial Force
Major Walter Paton MacCallum  20th Battalion, Australian Imperial Force
Major Archibald McKillop, 1st Field Ambulance, Australian Army Medical Corps
Major Sydney Albert Middleton, 19th Battalion, Australian Imperial Force
Major Edward James Milford, 4th Brigade, Australian Field Artillery
Major Claude Morlet, 13th Field Ambulance, Australian Army Medical Corps
Major William Alexander Morton, Australian Army Medical Corps, attd. 3rd Brigade, Australian Field Artillery
Lieutenant-Colonel Thomas Murdoch, 1st Pioneer Battalion, Australian Imperial Force
Major Harold Hillis Page  25th Battalion, Australian Imperial Force
Major John Henry Francis Pain  2nd Battalion, Australian Imperial Force
Major Hubert Stanley Wyborn Parker, 6th A. Brigade, Australian Field Artillery
Major Robert Stewart Reid, 5th Field Company, Australian Engineers
Major Burford Sampson, 15th Battalion, Australian Imperial Force
Lieutenant-Colonel William Henry Sanday  3rd Pioneer Battalion, Australian Imperial Force
Major Alexander Sanderson  3rd Tunneling Company, Australian Engineers
Major Vincent Wellesley Savage, 3rd Field Ambulance, Australian Army Medical Corps
Major William Campibell Sawers, 14th Field Ambulance, Australian Army Medical Corps
Major Thomas Browne Slaney, 8th Brigade, Australian Field Artillery
Lieutenant-Colonel George Ingram Stevenson  Australian Field Artillery
Major Frederick Street, 30th Battalion, Australian Imperial Force
Major Francis Thornthwaite  5th Divisional Artillery Column, Australian Field Artillery
Major Raymond Walter Tovell, 4th Pioneer Battalion, Australian Imperial Force
Lieutenant-Colonel Charles Vincent Watson, 58th Battalion, Australian Imperial Force
Major Stanley Holm Watson  2nd A. Divisional Signal Company, Australian Engineers
Captain Frank Alan Wisdom  30th Battalion, Australian Imperial Force

New Zealand Force
Lieutenant-Colonel George Craig, No. 1 New Zealand Field Ambulance, New Zealand Medical Corps
Captain Alexander Smith Falconer  Otago Regiment
Major William Ivan Kirke Jennings, Machine Gun Corps
Major Robert Gracie Milhgan, 15th Battery, 1st Brigade, New Zealand Field Artillery
Lieutenant-Colonel Norman Francis Shepherd, New Zealand Rifle Brigade
Major Clive Sommeryille, 12th Battery, 3rd Brigade, New Zealand Field Artillery
Major Neiwman Robert Wilson  2nd Battalion, Canterbury Regiment
Major Robert Adams Wilson, 6th Battalion, 2nd A. Brigade, New Zealand Field Artillery, attd. from Royal Garrison Artillery

South African Force
Temp Captain Philip Albert Myburgh Hands  South African Horse Artillery attd. 162nd Siege Battery, Royal Garrison Artillery
Major Herbert Harold Jenkins, 1st South African Infantry
Temp Major Lionel Herbert Maasdorp, 75th Siege Battery, South African Horse Artillery

For distinguished service in connection with Military Operations in Egypt: 
Temp Captain John Howard Alexander  Royal Engineers
Major Ernest Edward Austen, 28th (C. of L.) Battalion, London Regiment, attd. Royal Army Medical Corps
Major Leonard Avery Avery, Royal Army Medical Corps, attd. 1/1st Buckinghamshire Yeomanry
Major Harold Gordon Bagnall, Royal Garrison Artillery
Major Stanley Welch Beeman, Liverpool Regiment, attd. 2/5th Battalion, Hampshire Regiment
Temp Major William James Bensly, 1st Battalion, British West Indies Regiment
Major Leigh Harley Delves Broughton, Royal Field Artillery
Lieutenant-Colonel Gilbert Robert Cassels, 1st Battalion, 123rd Outrams Rifles, Indian Army
Captain Thomas George Frederick Cochrane, Royal Highlanders, attd. 2nd Battalion
Captain Walter Merry Craddock  2/20th (C. of L.) Battalion, London Regiment, attd. 2/19th Battalion
Major John Evelyn Davy, Royal Field Artillery
Lieutenant John William Downes  Shropshire Yeomanry, attd. 1/4th Battalion, Welsh Regiment
Major Walter Leslie Dundas, 4th Battalion, 11th Gurkha Rifles, Indian Army (late 2/3rd Gurkha Rifles)
Lieutenant-Colonel Charles Sidney Eastmead, 2nd Battalion 3rd Gurkha Rifles, Indian Army
Captain Newlyn Mason Elliott, Royal Horse Artillery, attd. B. Battery, Honourable Artillery Company
Major John Evans  Royal Army Medical Corps
Captain Evelyn Robert Leopold Fraser-MacKenzie  Royal Horse Artillery, attd. Nottinghamshire Battery
Captain Bernard Russell French, Royal Munster Fusiliers, attd. 5th Battalion, Royal Irish Fusiliers
Major Richard Gardiner. 53rd Sikhs, Indian Army
Major Gerard Maxwell Glynton, 3rd Gurkha Rifles, Indian Army
Major Herbert Stuart, Lord Hampton, 1/1st Worcestershire Yeomanry (late Rifle Brigade)
Major and Brevet Lieutenant-Colonel Hyla Napier Holden, 5th Cavalry, Indian Army
Captain James Arthur Jervois  Yorkshire Light Infantry, attd. 2/22nd Battalion, London Regiment
Major Bertram Graham Balfour Kidd, 1/125th Napiers Rifles, Indian Army, attd. 1st Battalion, 123rd Outrams Rifles
Captain Harold Gordon Canny Laird, 1st Battalion, 101st Grenadiers, Indian Army
Captain Patrick McEnroy  1st Battalion, Leinster Regiment
Major Percy Guy Wolfe Maynard, Royal Irish Rifles, attd. Egyptian Army
Lieutenant-Colonel and Brevet Colonel Shadwell John Murray, Connaught Rangers
Major Estricke Sidney Phillips, 195th Heavy Battery, Royal Garrison Artillery
Major Thomas Ellis Robins, City of London Yeomanry
Major Harold Middleton Drury Shaw, 1st Battalion, Gurkha Rifles, attd. 3rd Battalion, 3rd Gurkha Rifles, Indian Army
Major Douglas Brooke Charles Sladen, Royal Garrison Artillery, attd. 378th Siege Battery
Lieutenant-Colonel George Edward Stanley Smith, 1/4th Battalion, Duke of Cornwall's Light Infantry
Major Ian Mackintosh Smith  Somerset Light Infantry
Major Francis Edmond Crawshay Stanley, Royal Field Artillery
Lieutenant Anthony John Vernon  2nd Battalion, Royal Irish Fusiliers
Major Thomas Henry Walker, Royal Field Artillery
Major Harry Weisberg, City of London Yeomanry, attd. Machine Gun Corps
Captain John Hay Young  Argyll and Sutherland Highlanders, attd. 2/16th Battalion, London Regiment
Australian Imperial Force
Major Warren Melville Anderson, 6th Australian Light Horse Regiment
Major Michael Frederick Bruxner, 6th Australian Light Horse Regiment
Major Percy Dunningham, Australian Army Service Corps
Major Harold Arthur Maunder, Australian Army Service Corps
Major Stuart Archibald Tooth, 6th Australian Light Horse Regiment
Colonel Lachlan Chisholm Wilson  5th Australian Light Horse Regiment

For services rendered in connection with Military Operations in Italy:
Temp Captain Robert Lloyd Abell  104Ch Battery, 22nd Brigade, Royal Field Artillery
Major Kenneth Morland Agnew  Royal Field Artillery
Major Ernald Barnardiston, Royal Engineers
Captain John Percival Bate  1/8th Battalion, Worcestershire Regiment
Temp Major Howard Arthur Bowser, 171st Siege Battery, Royal Garrison Artillery
Captain Ralph Alexander Broderick  1/2nd Battalion, South Midland Brigade, Field Ambulance, Royal Army Medical Corps
Captain Hugh Vivian Combs  Buckinghamshire Battalion, Oxfordshire & Buckinghamshire Light Infantry, attd. 23rd Machine Gun Battalion
Temp Captain Leonard Montague Greenwood  13th (S.) Battalion, Durham Light Infantry
Captain Philip Ashley Hall  Buckinghamshire Battalion, Oxfordshire & Buckinghamshire Light Infantry
Lieutenant-Colonel Walter Henry Bell Jacob, Royal Garrison Artillery, Headquarters, 104th Brigade, Royal Garrison Artillery
Captain Maurice Luby  128th Field Company, Royal Engineers
Temp Captain William Mackenzie  Royal Army Medical Corps, attd. 9th Battalion, South Staffordshire Regiment
Captain Roderick Macleod  Royal Field Artillery, attd. 241st Brigade, Royal Field Artillery
Temp Captain Donald Murray, Manchester Regiment, attd. 21st Battalion
Temp Major William McCormick Sharpe, 197th Siege Battery, Royal Garrison Artillery
Temp Major James Thomas Walker  317th Siege Battery, Royal Garrison Artillery
Major Reginald Henry Montagu Watson, Royal Garrison Artillery, Headquarters, 15th Brigade, Royal Garrison Artillery

For valuable services rendered in connection with Military Operations in Salonika:
Temp Major Walter Storey Cowland, 12th Battalion, Hampshire Regiment
Temp Major Ivor Richard Cox, Royal Garrison Artillery
Major Knightley Fletcher Dunsterville, Royal Garrison Artillery
Major James Hector Edmond, Royal Garrison Artillery
Major Eric Victor Howard Fairtlough  Royal Artillery
Major Sydney Lancelot Harvey  Royal Engineers
Captain William Corson Holden  Royal Garrison Artillery
Temp Major David Niel Hossie, Royal Field Artillery
Major and Brevet Lieutenant-Colonel The Honourable Hugh Edward Joicey, 14th Hussars
Captain George Stanley McNaught, Cheshire Regiment
Captain and Brevet Major James Frederick Baker Morrell  East Lancashire Regiment
Major and Brevet Lieutenant-Colonel William Neilson, 4th Hussars
Lieutenant-Colonel Henry John Bartlet Span, 1st Battalion, Welsh Regiment
Captain and Brevet Major Claude Waterhouse Hearn Taylor, 3rd Battalion, Royal West Kent Regiment
Captain Leslie Hamilton Trist  Lincolnshire Regiment (S.E.)
Major Charles Henry Wallace, Royal Field Artillery
Major and Brevet Lieutenant-Colonel Arthur Hamilton Yatman, Somerset Light Infantry
Lieutenant Sidney Blyth  Royal Scots (S.E.), attd. 1st Battalion
Temp Lieutenant Humbert Victor Whittall  Special List
Temp Lieutenant Charles Edward Witcomb  2nd Battalion, Gloucestershire Regiment

For distinguished service in connection with Military Operations in North Russia
Major and Brevet Lieutenant-Colonel Frank Graham Marsh  Indian Army

In recognition of valuable services rendered with the Forces in Northern Russia:
Corporal W. B. Wilde, Royal Engineers (Southampton)
Private M. Fredjohn, Labour Corps, 9th Labour Battalion (Clapham)
Staff Sergeant Major W. R. Doe, Royal Army Service Corps (Slough)
Staff Sergeant Major C. Garside  Royal Army Service Corps (Salisbury)
Private F. Brown, Royal Army Service Corps (Leigh)
Conductor D. Leroy, Royal Army Ordnance Corps (Gravesend)
Private J. R. Chapman, Royal Army Ordnance Corps (Hassocks)

Awarded a Bar to the Distinguished Service Order (DSO*) 
Captain William Philip Jopp Akerman  Royal Field Artillery, attd. A. Battery, 295th (North Midland) Brigade, Royal Field Artillery
Major Vivian Allan Batchelor  Royal Field Artillery
Temp Major William Allan Bowen  10th Battalion, Worcestershire Regiment, Comdg. 1/4th Battalion, Shropshire Light Infantry
Lieutenant Wilkins Fitzwilliam Chipp  1/1st Battalion, Herefordshire Regiment
Captain Henry Wolryche Dakeyne  Royal Warwickshire Regiment, attd. 8th Battalion, North Staffordshire Regiment
Captain John Ralph Congreve Dent  1st Battalion, Royal Inniskilling Fusiliers
Lieutenant Alfred Hacking  1/8th Battalion, attd. 1/5th Battalion, Nottinghamshire and Derbyshire Regiment
Captain Romney Robert Godred Kane  1st Battalion, Royal Munster Fusiliers
Captain Cecil Lister  Northamptonshire Regiment, attd. 6th Battalion, South Staffordshire Regiment
Lieutenant Wilfrid Cabourn Smith  6th Battalion, King's Royal Rifle Corps, attd. 17th Battalion, Royal Fusiliers
Captain and Brevet Major Denis Mavisyn Anslow Sole  Border Regiment, attd. 10th Battalion, Worcestershire Regiment

Canadian Force
Major Charles Edward Connolly  Lord Strathcona's Horse, Canadian Cavalry
Brigadier-General George Stuart Tuxford  Saskatchewan Regiment, Comdg. Canadian Infantry Brigade

For distinguished service in connection with Military Operations in Egypt: 
Major Howard Lowndes Moir  1/7th Battalion, Cheshire Regiment

For services rendered in connection with Military Operations in Italy:
Major Herbert Dudley Carlton  Royal Scots, attd. 2nd Battalion, Royal West Surrey Regiment
Captain Cyril Ernest Napier Lomax  Welsh Regiment, attd. 21st Battalion, Manchester Regiment
Lieutenant-Colonel and Brevet Colonel Julian McCarty Steele  Coldstream Guards

For valuable services rendered in connection with Military Operations in Salonika:
Major Edward Hills Nicholson

Military Cross (MC) 
Temp Lieutenant Alexander Walter Abbey  250th T. Company, Royal Engineers
Captain Herbert Walter Acland-Troyte, 2/1st Devonshire Yeomanry
Temp Lieutenant Williaim Lawrence Adamson, 38th Battalion, Machine Gun Corps
Lieutenant Edward Walter Tracy Agar, let Battalion, King's Own Scottish Borderers
Lieutenant Hugh Aglionby, Royal Garrison Artillery, attd. 219th S. Battery
Temp Captain Richard John Aherne, Royal Army Medical Corps, attd. 9th Battalion, North Staffordshire Regiment
Lieutenant Thomas Ainsworth, 1/9th Battalion, Manchester Regiment, attd. 126th Light Trench Mortar Battery
Temp Lieutenant George James Aldous, Royal Army Service Corps, attd. 18th Division M.T. Company
Lieutenant David Alexander, Royal Garrison Artillery, attd. 524th S. Battery
Lieutenant Francis Alker, 5th Battalion, North Lancashire Regiment, attd. Intelligence Corps
Lieutenant Edward Blake Allan, Royal Garrison Artillery, attd. XIX Corps Heavy Artillery
Lieutenant John Harcourt Allen, Royal Garrison Artillery, attd. 144th S. Battery
Lieutenant William Noble Robb Alston, 1/4th Battalion, King's Own Scottish Borderers
Lieutenant George Ames, B/293rd London Brigade, Royal Field Artillery
Lieutenant Robert Alexander Andrew, Fife and Forfar Yeomanry, attd. 14th Battalion, Royal Highlanders
Rev. James Andrews, Royal Army Chaplains' Department, attd. D/78th Brigade, Royal Field Artillery
Temp Captain William Henry Ansell, 289th A.T. Company, Royal Engineers
Lieutenant John Norman Arnaud, Royal West Kent Regiment, attd. 8th Battalion
Lieutenant Mervyn Nevil Arnold-Forster, Grenadier Guards, attd. 4th Battalion, Guards Machine Gun Regiment
Rev. William Lynn Arrowsmith, Royal Army Chaplains' Department, attd. 2/4th Battalion, Royal Berkshire Regiment
Lieutenant George Hugo Daniel Ascoli, 2nd Dragoon Guards Spec. Reserve, attd. 1st Signal Squadron, Royal Engineers
Captain Percy Arthur Blundell Ashmead-Bartlett, 11th Battalion, London Regiment
Lieutenant Frank Ashton, Royal Field Artillery, attd. B/64th Brigade, Royal Field Artillery
Lieutenant Edward Kingston Stuart Aslat, Royal Garrison Artillery, attd. 249th S. Battery
Captain Gervase Babington, North Somerset Yeomanry, attd. Headquarters, 6th Cavalry Brigade
Quartermaster and Lieutenant Frederick Ferdinand Bailey  attd. 1/17th Battalion, London Regiment
Temp Captain Hugh Cossart Baker, Royal Artillery, attd. 91st Brigade, Royal Field Artillery
Lieutenant Thomas Ballantyne, 5th Battalion, King's Own Scottish Borderers, attd. Signal Service, Royal Engineers
Temp Lieutenant Edward Nathaniel Bancroft, 157th Field Company, Royal Engineers
Captain Basil Hastings Barber, King Edward's Horse, attd. Brit. Miss., Fr. General Headquarters
Temp Lieutenant Cecil Herbert Barclay, 3rd Signal Company, Royal Engineers
Captain James Barclay-Maine, Royal Field Artillery, attd. B/190th Brigade, Royal Field Artillery
Quartermaster and Captain Herbert Barker, 5th Battalion, Yorkshire Light Infantry
Temp 2nd Lieutenant Thomas Percy Barnes, 137th Company, L.C.
Temp2rtd Lieutenant David Ross Barr, 7th Battalion, Border Regiment
Quartermaster and Captain Thomas Barradell, 1st North Midland Field Ambulance, attd. 1/1st (Northumberland) Field Ambulance, Royal Army Medical Corps
Lieutenant Edmund Arthur Bartleet, Royal Garrison Artillery, attd. 263rd Siege Battery
Lieutenant Charles Harold Bateman, Royal Garrison Artillery, attd. 20th Siege Battery
Temp Captain George William Baxter, B/152nd Brigade, Royal Field Artillery
Temp Captain Frederick Scarth Beadon, 18th Battalion, Durham Light Infantry
Lieutenant Verey Alfred Beckley, Royal Garrison Artillery, attd. 187th Siege Battery
Captain William John Beddows, Royal Field Artillery
Temp Lieutenant Frederick John Beecham, 37th Battalion, Machine Gun Corps
Lieutenant Robert Buxton Beilby, 1/1st Yorkshire Dragoons, attd. Royal Engineers
Temp Lieutenant Alan Edmund Beeton, Camouflage Pk., Royal Engineers, attd. XnI Corps
Lieutenant Wilfred Bernard Belcher, Royal Berkshire Regiment
Captain Frederick Archibald Bell, Royal Engineers, attd. 4th Division Engineers
Lieutenant Henry George Bell, Royal Garrison Artillery, attd. 190th Siege Battery, Royal Garrison Artillery
Captain James Alan Bell, 7th Battalion, Durham Light Infantry
Lieutenant John Norman Bell, 6th Battalion, Welsh Regiment
Temp Lieutenant Eric Wilfrid John Bence, Headquarters, 87th Brigade, Royal Field Artillery
Lieutenant Percy Salisbury Bent, Royal Garrison Artillery, attd. 91st Brigade, Royal Garrison Artillery
Lieutenant Albert William Bentley, Royal Field Artillery, attd. Headquarters, 48th Brigade, Royal Field Artillery
Temp Lieutenant Walter Marcus Beresford, No. 2 Ry. Tel. Company, Royal Engineers
Lieutenant Roy Cressy Frederick Besch, 28th Battalion, London Regiment
Lieutenant Earle Best, 458th (West Riding) Field Company, Royal Engineers
Temp Lieutenant Edward Billington, 15th Battalion, Cheshire Regiment
Lieutenant Vernon Shirley Birt, Royal Garrison Artillery, attd. 101st Siege Battery
Captain Cuthbert Bernard Joseph Bishop, D/47th Brigade, Royal Field Artillery
Lieutenant Frederick Bishop, 1/5th Battalion, Cheshire Regiment, attd. 169th Infantry Brigade
Temp Captain William Collins Gordon Black, General List, attd. Headquarters, 103rd Infantry Brigade
Temp Lieutenant Arthur Basil Blagden, Lincolnshire Regiment, attd. 44th Trench Mortar Battery
Temp Lieutenant Cedric Blaker, 2nd Battalion, Royal Sussex Regiment
Temp 2nd Lieutenant Edwin James Blakemore, 2nd Battalion Royal Warwickshire Regiment, attd. 2/6th Battalion, North Staffordshire Regiment
Captain William Roy Blore  Royal Army Medical Corps, attd. 35th Field Ambulance
Captain Claude Leslie Bolton, 366th Battery, 117th Brigade, Royal Field Artillery
Lieutenant Robert Cecil-Bonsor, Welsh Guards, attd. 1st Battalion
Captain Colin Henry Alfred Borradaile, Royal Garrison Artillery, attd1/1st Kent Heavy Battery, Royal Garrison Artillery
Lieutenant Peter Swinton Boult, Royal Garrison Artillery, attd. R A.A. Battery
Lieutenant Wilfrid Augustin Ranulph Bourne, 513th Field Company, Royal Engineers
Lieutenant Ernest Bertie Bowell, Suffolk Regiment, attd. 11th Battalion
Temp Lieutenant John Bowen, 254th Tunneling Company, Royal Engineers
Lieutenant Wilfred Bowerbank, Northumberland Fusiliers, attd. 36th Battalion, Machine Gun Corps
Temp Lieutenant Adam, Hogg Bowie, 184th Tunneling Company, Royal Engineers
Temp Captain Richard Boxall, 1st Brigade, Tank Corps
2nd Lieutenant Edgar Brinton  D/174th Brigade, Royal Field Artillery
Lieutenant Bertram Brockleliurst, Royal Field Artillery, attd. 70th Brigade
Lieutenant Benjamin Collins Brodie, Surrey Yeomanry attd. 1/4th Battalion, Gordon Highlanders
Temp 2nd Lieutenant Frank Larden Bromfield, 1st Battalion, Royal Lancaster Regiment
Lieutenant George Leslie Bronsdon, 469th (North Midland) Field Company, Royal Engineers
Lieutenant Deny Anthony Brown, 1st Battalion, Royal West Surrey Regiment, attd. A. Signal Service
Quartermaster and Captain James Brown, 5/6th Battalion, Scottish Rifles
Captain Ernest Frederick Browning, West Somerset Yeomanry, attd. 122nd Company, L.C
Temp Captain Angus Buchanan  49th Field Ambulance, Royal Army Medical Corps
Temp Lieutenant William Dover Way Buckell, 21st Battalion, Machine Gun Corps
2nd Lieutenant George William Bullock, Royal Garrison Artillery, attd. 230th Siege Battery
Temp 2nd Lieutenant James Bullpitt, 1st Battalion, Machine Gun Corps
Captain William Burges, 66th S. Battery, Royal Garrison Artillery
Temp Lieutenant William French Burman, 2nd Battalion, Suffolk Regiment
Lieutenant Mark Hilvesley Jonas Burns-Lindow, Westmorland and Cumberland Yeomanry, attd. HQ XI. Corps
Lieutenant Gerald Keath Burston, Royal Field Artillery, attd. Headquarters, 76th Brigade, Royal Field Artillery
Lieutenant Philip Augustine Burton, Royal Field Artillery, attd. Brit. Miss. Portuguese Corps
Temp 2nd Lieutenant Herbert Gladstone William Busbridge, No. 9 M.T. Company, Royal Army Service Corps
Lieutenant Harry Butcher, Royal Garrison Artillery, attd. 366th S. Battery
Captain Charles Caddick-Adams, 5th Battalion, North Staffordshire Regiment, attd. 12th Battalion, Machine Gun Corps
Lieutenant Stanley Ewart Cairns, 1/7th, attd. 1/8th Battalion, Nottinghamshire and Derbyshire Regiment
Temp Lieutenant William Leonard Caldwell, 17th Bra Lancashire Fusiliers, attd. 104th Light Trench Mortar Battery
Lieutenant William Bedford St. George Cameron, Royal Dublin Fusiliers, attd. 1st Battalion
Temp Captain Colin Walter Campbell, Royal Garrison Artillery, attd. N. A.A Battery
Rev. John McLeod Campbell, Royal Army Chaplains' Department, attd. 4th Division
Lieutenant Patrick Seymour Campbell Campbell-Johnston, Royal Artillery
Temp Quartermaster and Lieutenant Michael Joseph Carey, 12th Battalion, Rifle Brigade
Sergeant Major John Alfred Carleton, 2nd Battalion, Royal Scots
Lieutenant Thomas Carlyle, 19th Battalion, London Regiment, attd. 1st Battalion, Rifle Brigade
Company Sergeant Major Thomas Patrick Carney  1st Battalion, East Yorkshire Regiment
Temp Captain David Leonard Carr, Royal Garrison Artillery, attd. Vn. Corps, Royal Artillery
Captain William Blacker Cathcart, Royal Army Medical Corps, attd. 72nd Field Ambulance
Lieutenant Richard Chaffer, 1/4th Battalion, South Lancashire Regiment
Temp Lieutenant Robert Mair Chalmers, 172nd Tunneling Company, Royal Engineers
Rev. Lawrence Godfrey Chamberlen, Royal Army Chaplains' Department
Captain Guy Oldham Chambers, Royal Army Medical Corps, attd. HQ Cavalry Corps
Lieutenant Andrew Lawrance Chapman, 5th Battalion, King's Own Scottish Borderers, attd. 6th Battalion
Temp Lieutenant Albert Rowland Chapman, 6th Battalion, Tank Corps
Temp 2nd Lieutenant Cyril Walter Charter, 1st Battalion, Tank Corps
Lieutenant Archibald George Church, Royal Garrison Artillery, attd. 238th S. Battery
Temp Captain Ernest Frank Churchill, 1st Tank Brigade, Signal Company, Royal Engineers
Temp Lieutenant Thomas Bailey Clapham, Royal Army Service Corps, attd. 66th Brigade, Royal Garrison Artillery
Temp Captain John Cosmo Clark, 13th Battalion, Middlesex Regiment
Temp Quartermaster and Lieutenant George Clarke, General List, attd. 43rd Labour Group HQ
Lieutenant Francis Charles Clayton, 6th Battalion, Northumberland Fusiliers, attd. 149th Infantry Brigade HQ
Captain Percy Lawrence Cockerill, 16th Battalion, London Regiment
Temp Captain Exio Sutherland Cockshut, 12th Battalion, Tank Corps
Temp Lieutenant Derek John Richard Coles, XI. Corps. Troops MT. Company, Royal Army Service Corps
Temp Captain John Colet Collett, Royal Engineers
Lieutenant Mark Harold Collet, No. 11 How. Battery, Royal Marine Artillery
Temp 2nd Lieutenant William Collier, 175th Company, L.C
Captain George Augustus Stevenson Collin, 4th R. Lancaster Brigade, Royal Field Artillery, attd. 15th Battery Royal Field Artillery
Temp Captain Albert William Coffingbourne, 9th Battalion, Royal Sussex Regiment
Lieutenant Frederick Charles Collins, 17th Divisional Artillery Column, Royal Field Artillery
Lieutenant Robert MacNaughton Connell, Royal Garrison Artillery, attd. 140th Heavy Battery
Lieutenant William Caldwell Connell, E. Kent Yeomanry, attd. 6th Battalion, East Kent Regiment
Temp Lieutenant Charles Henry Cook, 7th Battalion, Norfolk Regiment
2nd Lieutenant Ernest Norville Cooke, Royal Field Artillery, altd. B/330th (East Lancaster) Brigade, Royal Field Artillery
Lieutenant John Corke, 237th Siege Battery, Royal Garrison Artillery
Lieutenant Eric Denis Corkery, 1st Battalion, Devonshire Regiment
Lieutenant William Henry Elmo Cornish, Royal Field Artillery, attd. N. A.A. Battery
Lieutenant Alfred Douglas Gordon Courage, Royal Artillery, attd. Headquarters, 1st Army A.A. Def
Temp 2nd Lieutenant Andrew Gardiner Coventry, 8th Battalion, Northumberland Fusiliers
Captain Francis Bolam Cowen, 7th Battalion, Northumberland Fusiliers, attd. 6th Battalion, Machine Gun Corps
2nd Lieutenant George William Cox
Rev. Hubert Cecil Cox, Royal Army Chaplains' Department, attd. 16th Divisional Artillery Column
Lieutenant Frederick Cozens, Royal West Kent Regiment, attd. 4th Battalion, Tank Corps
Lieutenant Thomas Dick Craig, 1/5th Battalion, King's Own Scottish Borderers
Temp Quartermaster and Captain Archie William Craven, 3rd Battalion, Machine Gun Corps
Lieutenant Sidney Egerton Crooke, D/286th (West Lancaster) Brigade, Royal Field Artillery
Temp Captain Leslie John Croxford, 10th Battalion, Tank Corps
Captain Frederick Salter Cubitt, 4th Battalion, Suffolk Regiment
Lieutenant John McAdam Cunningham, 1st Battalion, Gordon Highlanders, attd. 12th Infantry Brigade HQ
Captain Cedric Isham Curteis, 108th Brigade, Royal Field Artillery
2nd Lieutenant Herbert Cusworth, Royal Garrison Artillery, attd. 499th Battery, Royal Garrison Artillery
Temp 2nd Lieutenant Frederick James Searle Dalton, 25th Battalion, Machine Gun Corps
2nd Lieutenant Francis Henry James Damp, 4th Battalion, Hampshire Regiment, attd. 15th
Captain Henry Edmund Blackburne Daniell, 9th Battalion, Durham Light Infantry, attd. 171st Company, Royal Engineers
Temp Lieutenant Howard Dargie, 12/13th Battalion, Northumberland Fusiliers, attd. 62nd Infantry Brigade
Temp Lieutenant David Davidson, 15th Field Company, Royal Engineers
Temp Lieutenant Walker Wheatley Davidson, 353rd Elec. and Mechanic Company, Royal Engineers
Lieutenant Harold Charles Edward Davis, 1st Battalion, Monmouthshire Regiment, attd. 15th Battalion, Cheshire Regiment
Lieutenant Rudolph Victor Dawes, 151st Siege Battery, Royal Garrison Artillery
Quartermaster and Lieutenant Horace Alfred Day, Royal Marines, Hawke Battalion, Royal Naval Division 
Captain Alan Murray Gordon Debenham, 1/7th Battalion, Lancashire Fusiliers
Temp Lieutenant Walter Edgar Demuth, 9th Battalion, Tank Corps
Temp Captain Charles Percival Denby, Royal Field Artillery, attd. 155th Brigade, Ammn. Column Royal Field Artillery
Temp Lieutenant Norman Heathfield Dendy, 42nd Brigade, Royal Field Artillery
2nd Lieutenant John Denyer, Royal Garrison Artillery, attd. 133rd Siege Battery
Captain Edward Hubert Michael de Stacpoole, Leinster Regiment
Temp Lieutenant Edward Newton Dickenson, 13th Battalion, King's Royal Rifle Corps
Temp Lieutenant Henry Alderman Dickman, 167th A.T. Company, Royal Engineers
Temp Lieutenant Edward Alfred Tandy Dillon, 250th Field Company, Royal Engineers
Rev. John Francis Dolan, Royal Army Chaplains' Department, attd. 15th Battalion, Cheshire Regiment
Quartermaster and Captain John Donald, 3rd Dragoon Guards
Lieutenant Alan July an Donkin, 409th Siege Battery, Royal Garrison Artillery
Captain Oscar Clayton Downes  Rifle Brigade
Temp Lieutenant Sydney Houghton Dowson, 1st Battalion, Royal Warwickshire Regiment
Temp Captain Charles Francis Drew  No. 9 Field Ambulance, Royal Army Medical Corps
Temp Lieutenant Alexander MacGregor Duff, attd. 84th Battery, 84th Brigade, Royal Field Artillery
Captain James Catto Duffus, 255th Brigade, Royal Field Artillery
Captain Leslie Bland Dufton, 2/1st Lancaster Brigade, Royal Garrison Artillery, attd. 109th Heavy Battery, Royal Garrison Artillery
Lieutenant Charles Frederick Dumper, Royal Garrison Artillery, attd. 323rd Siege Battery
Lieutenant Peter Colin Duncan, 2/4th Battalion, Royal West Surrey Regiment
Captain Ernest McMurchie Dunlop  Royal Army Medical Corps, T.Fi, attd. 14th Battalion, Worcestershire Regiment
Lieutenant Henry Augustus Dupre, 446th Northumberland Field Company, Royal Engineers
2nd Lieutenant William Henry Duranty, Royal Garrison Artillery, attd. 199th Siege Battery
Lieutenant Reginald Tom Durrant, 223rd (Home Counties) Brigade, Royal Field Artillery
Temp Lieutenant Robert Easten, 69th Field Company, Royal Engineers
Temp 2nd Lieutenant Percy Tucker Easton, 229th Field Company, Royal Engineers
Lieutenant Rowland Wynne Eaton, Royal Garrison Artillery, attd. D. A.A. Battery
Lieutenant Wilfred Austin Ebbels, B/168th Brigade, Royal Field Artillery
Temp Lieutenant Leonard Oswald Edminson, General List
Lieutenant The Honourable George Henry Edwardes, Royal Field Artillery, attd. 150th Amy. Brigade, Ammunition Column, Royal Field Artillery
Captain John Henry Murray Edye, York & Lancaster Regiment
Lieutenant Edgar Charles Ellen, Honourable Artillery Company, attd. 2/A Battery, 126th Brigade, Royal Field Artillery
Lieutenant Walter Robert Elliot, 2/20th Battalion, London Regiment
Lieutenant Arthur Charles Ellis, Royal Field Artillery, attd. Headquarters, 18th Divisional Artillery Column
Lieutenant Leslie Thomas Elvy, 1/13th Battalion, London Regiment
Captain Geoffrey Elwell, 6th Battalion, South Staffordshire Regiment
Lieutenant-Cyril Fullard Entwistle, Royal Garrison Artillery, attd. 235th Siege Battery
Lieutenant Joseph Entwistle, 428th (East Lancaster) Field Company, Royal Engineers
Lieutenant James Oliver Ewart, Royal Engineers
Lieutenant William Noel Exelby, Royal Engineers, attd. 17th Corps. Signal Company, Royal Engineers
Lieutenant Stanley Stephens Eyre, Royal Field Artillery, attd. 58th London Brigade
Lieutenant Archibald Brodie Falconer, 5th Battalion, attd. 1/8th Battalion, Royal Scots
2nd Lieutenant Stanley Arthur Robert Farrall, Royal Garrison Artillery, attd. 328th Siege Battery
Quartermaster and Captain Benjamin Farrar, 8th Battalion, West Yorkshire Regiment
Lieutenant Walter Douglas Faulkner, 2nd Battalion, Irish Guards
Temp Lieutenant Charles Francis Carew Featherstonhaugh, 11th Battalion, Essex Regiment
Temp Lieutenant John Scott Finn, 120th Heavy Battery, Royal Garrison Artillery
Temp Captain The Honourable Harold Edward Fitzclarence, General List, attd. Headquarters, 47th Division
Lieutenant James Gerald Fitzmaurice, 2nd Battalion, Royal Munster Fusiliers, attd. Tank Corps
Lieutenant Philip Cawthorne Fletcher, 42nd (East Lancaster) Divisional Signals Company, Royal Engineers
Lieutenant Arthur Flowers, 25th Divisional Artillery Column, Royal Field Artillery
Temp Lieutenant David Forgan, 278th Railway Company, Royal Engineers
Lieutenant Herbert James Forty, 1/7th Battalion, West Riding Regiment
Temp Captain Reginal Charles Foster, 238th Army Trps. Company, Royal Engineers
Captain John Stanley Fox, 5th Battalion, Manchester Regiment
Temp Lieutenant Hugh Cowan Fraser, King's Own Scottish Borderers 10690
Company Sergeant Major Ernest Frazier  1st Battalion, Worcestershire Regiment
Lieutenant Richard Arthur Frederick Freeman, Worcestershire Regiment, attd. 11th Battalion, Tank Corps
Captain Arthur Leslie Irvine Friend, 7th Dragoon Guards
Temp Captain Edward William Fuggle, 12th Battalion, Nottinghamshire and Derbyshire Regiment
2nd Lieutenant Norman de Putron Fuzzey, Royal Garrison Artillery Spec. Reserve, attd. Headquarters, 64th Brigade Royal Garrison Artillery
Captain Alexander Galloway, Scottish Rifles
Lieutenant William Ronald Gardiner, Royal Field Artillery, attd. 85th Battery, 11th Brigade, Royal Field Artillery
Lieutenant Edward Norman Gardner, 6th Battalion, Gloucestershire Regiment, attd. 2/5th Battalion
Lieutenant Alfred Edward Gayer, Royal Garrison Artillery Spec. Reserve, attd. 2/1st Lowd. Heavy Battery, Royal Garrison Artillery
Lieutenant Percy Hedon Gibbins, 282nd (London) Army Brigade, Royal Field Artillery
Lieutenant Robert Withers Jacomb Gibbon, Royal Field Artillery Spec. Reserve, attd. Signal Sub-Section, Royal Engineers, 5th A. Brigade, Royal Horse Artillery
Rev. John Stanley Gibbs, Royal Army Chaplains' Department, attd. 3rd Cavalry Division
Temp Captain John Gibson  98th Field Ambulance, Royal Army Medical Corps
2nd Lieutenant Alexander Richard Gifford, Royal Field Artillery Spec. Reserve, attd. D/277th (West Lancaster) Brigade, Royal Field Artillery
Captain Vincent Gunton Gilbey, Royal Field Artillery, attd. 175th Brigade, Ammunition Column, Royal Field Artillery
Rev. W. Plan Gillieson, Royal Army Chaplains' Department, attd. 51st (Highd) Division
Temp Lieutenant Clarence William Gladwell, Royal Engineers, attd. 109th Company, Labour Company
Lieutenant Joseph Henry Goodhart, 20th Hussars
Quartermaster and Captain William Goodly, 136th Field Ambulance, Royal Army Medical Corps
Temp Lieutenant Francis Walden Gordon, 32nd Battalion, Machine Gun Corps
Temp Captain Gerard Stafford Staveley Gordon, 17th Battalion, Northumberland Fusiliers
Captain James Gordon, Royal Scots, attd. 17th Battalion
Captain Bertrand William Whichcot Goatling, Royal Fusiliers
Lieutenant John Romaine Govett, Royal Field Artillery, attd. C/86th Brigade, Royal Field Artillery
Lieutenant Sydney John Gowland, 5th Battalion, Lancashire Fusiliers, attd. 11th Battalion
Lieutenant Patrick Ludoric Graham, 2nd Battery, 16th A. Brigade, Royal Horse Artillery
Rev. Andrew Grant, Royal Army Chaplains' Department, attd. 51st Ddv
Temp Captain Wilfred Campbell Grant, 93rd Battery, Royal Field Artillery, attd. 280th (London) Brigade, Royal Field Artillery
Lieutenant Thomas Brunton Grantham, Royal Field Artillery, attd. Headquarters, 33rd Brigade, Royal Field Artillery
Rev. Samuel Frederick Green, Royal Army Chaplains' Department, attd. 1/4th Battalion, London Regiment
Temp Lieutenant Walter Green, 2nd Battalion, West Riding Regiment, attd. 10th Trench Mortar Battery
Captain William Gregson, 57th West Lancaster Divisional Train, Royal Army Service Corps
Temp Lieutenant Dudley Greville, 9th Battalion, Cheshire Regiment
Sergeant Major George William Griffin, 1st Battalion, Royal Berkshire Regiment
Captain Frank Albert Griffiths, 4th Battalion, Royal Welsh Fusiliers, attd. 16th Battalion
Captain Eric Llewellyn Griffith Griffith-Williams, 135th Battery, 32nd Brigade, Royal Field Artillery
Captain Frederick Steven Brant Grotrian, 112th Battery, Royal Garrison Artillery
Captain Lionel Francis Boulderson Groube, Royal Fusiliers
Captain Francis Henry Guppy, Royal Army Medical Corps, attd. 8th M.A.C.
Temp Lieutenant Ernest Gower Guthrie, 126th Field Company, Royal Engineers
Temp Lieutenant Leonard Rome Guthrie, Royal Engineers, Headquarters, 15th Division
Temp Captain Ernest Leon Maunsell Hackett, 8th Field Ambulance, Royal Army Medical Corps
Lieutenant John Hadden, Royal Engineers, attd. 20th Divisional Signals Company, Royal Engineers
Lieutenant William Isaac Haig-Scott, Royal Field Artillery, attd. Headquarters, 93rd A. Brigade, Royal Field Artillery
Captain Frederick William Hall, 342nd Siege Battery, Royal Garrison Artillery
Temp Captain James Mitchell Halley, 62nd Field Company, Royal Engineers
Sergeant Major Benjamin Hallmark, 1st Battalion, Cheshire Regiment
Temp Lieutenant David Hamilton, 28th Ordnance Workshop (Light), Royal Army Ordnance Corps
Temp 2nd Lieutenant Howard George Hands, A. Corps Signal Company, Royal Engineers
Temp Captain Arthur Keith Harding, 10th Battalion, Royal West Kent Regiment
Lieutenant Leonard Stuart Harland, Dorsetshire Regiment and 4th Supply Company, Tank Corps
Lieutenant Paxton Harrington, 1/6th Battalion, Argyll and Sutherland Highlanders
Temp Captain Frederick George Harris, 16th Battalion, Highland Light Infantry
Lieutenant Rowland Austin Harris, Royal Engineers, attd. 569th (Hampshire.) A.T. Company, Royal Engineers
Captain Edward Cayley Harrison, Royal Garrison Artillery attd. T. A.A. Battery
Captain Henry Royston Hart, 1/4th, attd. 1/5th Battalion, Royal Lancaster Regiment
Captain Seymour Hart, Royal Field Artillery, attd. C/232nd Brigade, Royal Field Artillery
Lieutenant Geoffrey Hamilton William Hartcup, Dorsetshire Regiment, attd. 213th Siege Battery, Royal Garrison Artillery
Temp Lieutenant Charles Frederick Harwood, 15th Battalion, Lancashire Fusiliers
Temp Quartermaster and Lieutenant Frank Walter Hay, 4th Battalion, Machine Gun Corps
Temp Lieutenant Gerald Patrick Hayes, 204th Siege Battery, Royal Garrison Artillery
Lieutenant Benjamin William Heaton, 12th Battalion, Manchester Regiment
Temp 2nd Lieutenant Tom Thackray Heaton, 10th Battalion, Royal Warwickshire Regiment
Lieutenant David Hendry, Royal Garrison Artillery, attd. 30th Siege Battery, Royal Garrison Artillery
Temp Lieutenant Percy Henstock, 3rd Battalion, Worcestershire Regiment
Temp Lieutenant Charles Clifford Henwood, 258th (T.) Company, Royal Engineers
Quartermaster and Captain Henry Thomas Hester, 1st Battalion, Royal Scots Fusiliers
Temp 2nd Lieutenant Ernest William Hewland, 15/17th Battalion, West Yorkshire Regiment
Captain Cecil Albert Heydeman, 2nd Dragoon Guards
Temp 2nd Lieutenant Roland Heygate, 23rd Battalion, Middlesex Regiment, attd. 123rd Infantry Brigade HQ
Temp 2nd Lieutenant Torn Aubrey Heywood, 1st Battalion, Tank Corps
2nd Lieutenant Peter Hicks, 4th Battalion, East Kent Regiment attd. Intelligence Corps
Temp 2nd Lieutenant Richard James Hicks, 24th Battalion, Royal Fusiliers
Temp Captain Samuel Hilton, 9th Battalion, Royal Fusiliers
Lieutenant Frederick Wystan Hipkins, 1/6th Battalion, Nottinghamshire and Derbyshire Regiment
Captain Dudley Ashton Hope Hire, 69th Siege Battery, Royal Garrison Artillery
Captain Adrian Eliot Hodgkin, 1/5th Battalion, Cheshire Regiment, attd. A. Spec. Company, Royal Engineers
Temp Lieutenant Lennox Holt, attd. 75th BrigadeT Royal Field Artillery
Temp Lieutenant Charles Edward Hopkinson, General List
Captain Frederick Geoffrey Hornshaw, 6th Battalion, West Yorkshire Regiment
Temp 2nd Lieutenant Stanley Whittaker Howard, 13th Battalion, attd. 1st Battalion, East Yorkshire Regiment
Lieutenant Robert MacDonald Howatt, Royal Army Service Corps, attd. 6/7th Battalion, Royal Scots Fusiliers, attd. 18th Scottish Rifles
Lieutenant James Leslie Howell, D/44th Brigade, Royal Field Artillery
Lieutenant Thomas Windlow Howey, 8th Battalion, attd. 1/7th Battalion, Durham Light Infantry
Temp Lieutenant William Lewis Hoyland, 4th Battalion, North Staffordshire Regiment, secd. 2nd Battalion, Tank Corps
Captain Philip Herbert Hudson, 1st Battalion, Hampshire Regiment
Lieutenant Robert Lawrence Hulme, 1/2nd Battalion, London Regiment, secd. 5bth Machine Gun Corps
Captain Charles Westley Hume, 19th Battalion, London Regiment, attd. 1st Army Signal Company, Royal Engineers
2nd Lieutenant Cecil Alfred Hunt, Royal Field Artillery, attd. HQ 39th Brigade, Royal Field Artillery
2nd Lieutenant Sydney Alfred Hurxen, Royal Garrison Artillery, attd. 120th Siege Battery, Royal Garrison Artillery
Lieutenant Ernest Amphlett Huskisson, 1/3rd Battalion, Nottinghamshire and Derbyshire Regiment
Temp Lieutenant Legh Richmond Hutchison, 33rd Battalion, Machine Gun Corps
Company Sergeant Major George Frederick Hyde  9th Battalion, East Surrey Regiment
Company Sergeant Major George Imisson  1/4th Battalion, York & Lancaster Regiment
Captain Harry Infeld, 12th Battalion, London Regiment, emp. Q Spec. Company, Royal Engineers
Rev. Matthew Tierney Ingram, Royal Army Chaplains' Department
Captain Cuthbert Irwin, 1/7th Battalion, Cheshire Regiment
Lieutenant John Henry Ivens, 152nd Siege Battery, Royal Garrison Artillery
Temp 2nd Lieutenant James Lawrence Jack, 55th Battalion, Machine Gun Corps
Rev. James Henry Jackman, Royal Army Chaplains' Department, attd. 13th Battalion, Liverpool Regiment
Temp Captain Ivor Jackson, General List
2nd Lieutenant Lawrence Nelson Jackson, Royal Field Artillery attd. D/46th Brigade
Lieutenant Frank James, Royal Horse Artillery, attd. 3rd Cavalry Divisional Ammunition Column
Lieutenant Victor Octavius James, 527th (Durham) Field Company, Royal Engineers
Captain John Puxley White Jamie, 14th Battalion, Leicestershire Regiment
Temp Lieutenant George Frederick Jervaulx Jarvis, 5th Reserve of Cavalry, attd. 9th Battalion, Yorkshire Regiment
Lieutenant Ralph Jee, 11th Battalion, Durham Light Infantry
Lieutenant Percy Jeffs, Royal Field Artillery, attd. 286th Brigade, Royal Field Artillery
Temp Lieutenant Percival Jennings, S. Corps. Signal Company, Royal Engineers
Sergeant Major James Jesse, 6th Battalion, Machine Gun Corps
Temp Lieutenant Nicholas Allen Johns, 31st Battalion, Machine Gun Corps
Lieutenant Alfred Forbes Johnson, Royal Garrison Artillery, attd. 69th Siege Battery, Royal Garrison Artillery
Lieutenant Peachy Wilson Johnston, 256th (Highland) Brigade, Royal Field Artillery
Quartermaster and Lieutenant Charles Alfred Jones, 1/23rd Battalion, London Regiment
Lieutenant Percy Francis Fitzgerald Keane, 1/18th Battalion, London Regiment
Temp Lieutenant Frederick Howard Keatch, Royal Artillery
Lieutenant William Melville Kemmis-Betty, Royal Garrison Artillery, attd. K. A.A. Battery
Temp Captain Percival Albert Kinward, Royal Army Service Corps
Lieutenant Harry Wilson Keys, Headquarters, 231st (North Midland) Brigade, Royal Field Artillery
Temp Lieutenant Albert King, 2nd Battalion, Royal Scots Fusiliers
Temp Captain Henry Frederick King, General List
Lieutenant Sidney Chevalier Kirkmari, attd. 72nd-Army Brigade, Royal Field Artillery
Lieutenant Walter Henry Lace, 439th (Cheshire) Field Company, Royal Engineers, formerly 511th (London) Field Company
2nd Lieutenant Frank de Moulfield Laine, 1st Battalion, Royal Guernsey Light Infantry
Lieutenant John Ker Lamberton, 5th Battalion, Scottish Rifles, secd. 58th Battalion, Machine Gun Corps
Lieutenant Alfred William Lambourne, Royal Engineers
Lieutenant Philip Gilbert Lancaster, 1/5th Battalion, East Lancashire Regiment
Temp Lieutenant John Errington Lang, 3rd Battalion, Royal Berkshire Regiment, attd. 62nd Battalion, Machine Gun Corps
Lieutenant James Edward Charles Langham, 5th Battalion, Royal Sussex Regiment, attd. 8th Battalion
Captain Alan Frederick Lascelles, 1/1st Bedford Yeomanry, attd. 15th Hussars
Temp Captain Frank Herbert Lathbury, 181st Tunneling Company, Royal Engineers
Captain William R. Law, 7th Battalion, Scottish Rifles, attd. 74th Divisional Signals Company, Royal Engineers
Temp Captain Philip Henry Lawless, General List
Lieutenant Edward Charles Lawson, 2nd Battalion, Middlesex Regiment
Temp Lieutenant George Francis Laycock, 180th Tunneling Company, Royal Engineers
Lieutenant William Lead, 15th Divisional Artillery Column, Royal Field Artillery
Temp Captain Arthur Brian Leake, General List, attd. 102nd Infantry Brigade
Temp Captain Walter Burditt Leane, Royal Engineers
Lieutenant Ralph Bertram le Cornu, Royal Army Service Corps, attd. 5th Battalion, Dorsetshire Regiment
Captain Roland le Fanu, Leicestershire Regiment
Lieutenant Arthur Francis Leighton, Royal Field Artillery, attd. 10th Battery, 147th Brigade
Rev. William Watson Leonard, Royal Army Chaplains' Department, attd. 56th Division
Captain Davis Lewis, 3rd Battalion, London Regiment
2nd Lieutenant Frank Lewis  1st Battalion, Scottish Rifles, attd. 9th Battalion, Highland Light Infantry, T.P
Lieutenant Herbert Earl Charles Lewis, 46th Divisional Signals Company, Royal Engineers
Lieutenant Valentine Place Ley son, 3rd Battalion, South Lancashire Regiment, attd. 3rd Field Survey Battalion, Royal Engineers
Temp Lieutenant James William Lipscomb, 16th Battalion, King's Royal Rifle Corps
Temp Captain Ernest Hugh Llewellyn, General List
Lieutenant Bertie Lloyd, C/275th (West Lancaster) Brigade, Royal Field Artillery
Captain Roderick Croil Lloyd, 1/1st Denbigh Yeomanry
Quartermaster and Captain Patrick Barnard Loakman, 1/7th Battalion, Cheshire Regiment
Lieutenant Frederick James Lockington, 2nd Battalion, South Lancashire Regiment
Captain Cecil William Lockwood, 2/4th, attd. 5th Battalion, West Riding Regiment
Temp Captain Isaac Vernon Longley, Railway Optg. Division, Royal Engineers
Captain Arthur Lord, D/246th (West Riding) Brigade, Royal Field Artillery
Lieutenant Merlin Forster Loxton, Royal Field Artillery, attd. 114th Brigade, Royal Field Artillery
Lieutenant Alfred Basil Lubbock, 1/3rd (Wessex) Brigade, Royal Field Artillery, attd. 52nd Brigade, Royal Field Artillery
2nd Lieutenant Henry Joseph Lucas  2nd Battalion Yorkshire Regiment
Lieutenant Cyril Gordon Luchford, 14th Battalion, Northumberland Fusiliers
Temp Lieutenant Frank Ludlam, B/107th Brigade, Royal Field Artillery
Lieutenant Philip Lumley, Royal Garrison Artillery, attd. 137th Siege Battery, Royal Garrison Artillery
Captain Edenby Gordon Lutyens, D/23rd Brigade, Royal Field Artillery
Temp Captain Robert Charles Lyle, 81st Company, Royal Army Service Corps, attd. 3rd Cavalry, Division HQ
2nd Lieutenant George Macdonald, Royal Field Artillery, attd. 110th Brigade, Royal Field Artillery
Captain James Macdonald, Royal Field Artillery, attd. B/187th Brigade, Royal Field Artillery
Company Sergeant Major John McDonald  1/8th Battalion, Argyll and Sutherland Highlanders
Lieutenant John Duncan Macdonald, Royal Artillery
Temp Lieutenant Laurin MacEwan, Royal Field Artillery
Temp Lieutenant Thomas Macfie, 1st Battalion, Scottish Rifles
Lieutenant Lovel Durant Mack, 211th (East Lancaster) Brigade, Royal Field Artillery
Lieutenant Frederick William Mackay, 1/4th Battalion, Yorkshire Light Infantry
2nd Lieutenant Norman Douglas MacKay, 80th Field Company, Royal Engineers
Temp Lieutenant Colin John Mackenzie-Grieve, General List
Temp Captain Roperic William Macklin, Royal Garrison Artillery, attd. 50th Siege Battery, Royal Garrison Artillery
Temp Captain Roswell Murray MacTavish, General List
Captain George R. Madge, Royal Engineers
Temp Captain Harry Maitland Maitland, Special List, attd. Intelligence Corps
Lieutenant Robert Graham Mann, 5th, attd. 5/6th Battalion, Royal Scots
Lieutenant Henry Vaughan Markham, Royal Garrison Artillery, attd. Headquarters, 2nd Brigade, Royal Garrison Artillery
Temp Lieutenant Harry Lewis Marsh, 16th Battalion, Royal Welsh Fusiliers
Temp 2nd Lieutenant William Marshall, 49th Battalion, Machine Gun Corps
Lieutenant Alfred Guy Trice Martin, Royal Field Artillery, attd. Headquarters, 112th Brigade, Royal Field Artillery
Company Sergeant Major Charles Martin  1st Battalion, Nottinghamshire and Derbyshire Regiment
Lieutenant Norman Todd Martin, attd. 104th Brigade, Royal Field Artillery
2nd Lieutenant George Herbert Mason, Royal Garrison Artillery, attd. 193rd Siege Battery, Royal Garrison Artillery
Captain George Leslie Matthews, 1st (London) San. Company, Royal Army Medical Corps
Temp Lieutenant Harold Killegrew Matthews, 1st Field Survey Company, Royal Engineers
Lieutenant Frederick McBride, 3rd Battalion, Coldstream Guards
Lieutenant Charles Edwin Albert Mc.Carthy, Headquarters, 18th A. Brigade, Royal Field Artillery
Temp Captain Charles Walter McConnan, 8th Battalion, Border Regiment, attd. 2nd Battalion, Lincolnshire Regiment
Captain William Russell McCrae, 2/1st (Lancaster) Heavy Battery, Royal Garrison Artillery
Lieutenant Samuel McDermott, Royal Garrison Artillery, attd. 186th Siege Battery
Temp Captain James Matheson McIver, 206th Field Company, Royal Engineers
Temp 2nd Lieutenant Alexander McKendrick, Highland Light Infantry, attd. 12th Battalion, Royal Scots Fusiliers
Temp Lieutenant Septimus Oswin McLearen, 20th Battalion, Machine Gun Corps
Temp 2nd Lieutenant Thomas Ronaldson McMillan, Royal Army Service Corps, attd. 346th Siege Battery, Royal Garrison Artillery
2nd Lieutenant Herbert Meathrel  Royal Field Artillery, attd. C/290th (London) Brigade, Royal Field Artillery
Temp Lieutenant James Aitken Brown Menzies, 208th Siege Battery, Royal Garrison Artillery
Temp Lieutenant Guy Mercer, General List
Lieutenant Harold Middlewood, Royal Garrison Artillery, attd. P. A.A. Battery
Lieutenant Robert William Miles  Royal Field Artillery, attd. 170th Brigade, Royal Field Artillery
Lieutenant Robert MacGregor Millar, Somerset Light Infantry, attd. Royal Engineers Signal Company, 3rd Tank Brigade
Temp Lieutenant Arthur Warren Millard, 25th A.T. Company, Royal Engineers
Temp Lieutenant Gordon Mitchell, 154th Field Company, Royal Engineers
Lieutenant Eric Edward Mockler-Ferryman, 29th Brigade, Headquarters, Royal Field Artillery
Captain Kenneth Macrae Moir, 5th Battalion, East Surrey Regiment, attd. 29th Battalion, Machine Gun Corps
Temp Lieutenant Charles Beresford Montgomery, 1st Battalion, Lancashire Fusiliers
Captain Arthur Moon, 8th Battalion, London Regiment
Temp Quartermaster and Lieutenant James Moore, 16th Field Ambulance, Royal Army Medical Corps
Lieutenant Vivian John Moore, Royal Garrison Artillery, attd. 85th Brigade
Lieutenant Frank Morgan, Royal Garrison Artillery, attd. 352nd Siege Battery, Royal Garrison Artillery
Temp Lieutenant Walter Beveridge Morgan, 9th Battalion, Royal Welsh Fusiliers
Captain Temple Morris, 21st Heavy Battery, Royal Garrison Artillery
Temp Lieutenant George Muir, Royal Engineers, attd. 29th (1/1st London) Divisional Signals Company, Royal Engineers
Lieutenant James Lees Murgatroyd, Royal Engineers, attd. No. 5 (Royal Anglesey) Field Company
Lieutenant Charles Murray, 115th Siege Battery, Royal Garrison Artillery
Temp Sergeant Major George Murray, Scots Guards, attd. 1/4th Battalion, King's Own Scottish Borderers
Lieutenant John Kininmonth Murray, 5th Battalion, Royal Scots Fusiliers
Captain Frederick William Musgrave, 1/6th Battalion, West Yorkshire Regiment
Captain William Edward Stirling Napier, Lothians and Border Horse, and 61st Battalion, Machine Gun Corps
Temp Lieutenant Frederick Charles Nawton, 15th Battalion, Machine Gun Corps
Temp Captain William Edward Walter Naylor, 10th Battalion, East Yorkshire Regiment
Lieutenant Harold Thomas Nelmes, 1/2nd Battalion, Monmouthshire Regiment
Captain John Walron Nelson, 156th Heavy Battery, Royal Garrison Artillery
Captain Clark Nicholson  Royal Army Medical Corps, attd. 49th Field Ambulance
Lieutenant Earl David Nicoll, 4th, attd. 6th, Battalion, Royal Highlanders
2nd Lieutenant Guy Harsant Norman, Royal Garrison Artillery, attd. 129th Siege Battery
Temp Lieutenant Sidney North, Royal Warwickshire Regiment, attd. 1/5th Battalion, Lancashire Fusiliers
Lieutenant Cyril Tait O'Callaghan, 1st Royal Dragoons
Captain Arthur Patrick O'Connor  11th Field Ambulance, Royal Army Medical Corps
Captain William Julian Odium, Royal Field Artillery, attd. Headquarters, 27th Brigade, Royal Field Artillery
2nd Lieutenant Edgar Oldham, Royal Garrison Artillery, attd. 135th Heavy Battery, Royal Garrison Artillery
2nd Lieutenant Sydney Alfred Oldham, Royal Garrison Artillery, attd. 4th Siege Battery, Royal Garrison Artillery
Captain George Barry Oliver, 4th Battalion, Leicestershire Regiment, attd. 14th Battalion
Temp 2nd Lieutenant George Upton O'Meara, 15th Battalion, Tank Corps
Captain John Orr-Ewing, 16th Lancers
Captain Roland George Orred, Royal Fusiliers
Lieutenant Leslie Charles Cameron Owen, Royal Irish Fusiliers
Temp Lieutenant Hugh Ffolliott-Ozanne, Royal Field Artillery
2nd Lieutenant R. Alderney, Artillery
Temp 2nd Lieutenant Henry Arthur Kivers Pantlin, 5th Battalion, Royal Berkshire Regiment, attd. 35th Trench Mortar Battery
Captain Hugh Ford Parbury, 17th Lancers
Lieutenant Kingsley Croft Parker, Royal Garrison Artillery, attd. 145th Siege Battery
Temp Quartmaster and Captain Charles Walter Patch, 15th Battalion, Lancashire Fusiliers
Temp Captain Alexander McCulloch Paterson, 248th Field Company, Royal Engineers
Captain George Arthur Reginald Paterson, 7th Battalion, Gordon Highlanders
Sergeant Major Samuel Alfred Patman, 56th Field Ambulance, Royal Army Medical Corps
Captain John Henry Alexander Patton, Royal Irish Rifles, attd. 15th Battalion
Lieutenant Arthur Forman Balfour Paul, 457th Field Company, Royal Engineers
Lieutenant Arthur Henry Paull, 1/5th Battalion, Duke of Cornwall's Light Infantry
Temp Lieutenant Richard Pearce, Labour Corps, attd. 23rd Battalion, Lancashire Fusiliers
Temp 2nd Lieutenant Geoffrey Lockington Pearson, 50th Battalion, Machine Gun Corps
Temp Lieutenant Francis Richard Jonathan Peel, attd. 148th Brigade, Royal Field Artillery
Lieutenant John Perry, Royal Field Artillery, attd. 3rd Brigade, Royal Horse Artillery, Amn. Col
Lieutenant Arthur Todd Phillips, 135th A.T. Company, Royal Engineers
Captain Charles Kendall Phillips, West Yorkshire Regiment, attd. 62nd Divisional Signals Company, Royal Engineers
Lieutenant Basil Henry Pickering, 18th Battalion, York & Lancaster Regiment, formerly West Yorkshire Regiment
Temp Lieutenant Kenneth Twyneham Pike, 74th Battalion, Machine Gun Corps
Temp Lieutenant Gonne St. Clair Pilcher, Special List, attd. Intelligence Corps
Lieutenant Gerald Arthur Pilleau, 1st Battalion, Royal West Surrey Regiment
Captain Hugh Tunbridge Pomfret, 17th Battalion, Manchester Regiment
Lieutenant Charles William Miller Potts, 50th Divl, Royal Engineers
Temp 2nd Lieutenant George Potts, 121st Field Company, Royal Engineers
Lieutenant Henry Rupert Powell, 556th (Glamorgan) A.T. Company, Royal Engineers
Temp Captain James Farquharson Powell, Royal Army Medical Corps, attd. Headquarters, 76th Brigade, Royal Garrison Artillery
Lieutenant Lawrence Powell, Royal Field Artillery, attd. Headquarters, 121st Brigade, Royal Field Artillery
Lieutenant Kingsmoll Foster Manley Power, 1/7th Battalion, Cheshire Regiment
Temp Captain George Pride, 10th Battalion, Scottish Rifles
Lieutenant Harold Gordon Lusby Prynne, 1/13th Battalion, London Regiment
Rev. Harold Septimus Pugh, Royal Army Chaplains' Department, attd. 68th Brigade, Royal Garrison Artillery
Captain Harold James Pullein-Thompson, Royal West Surrey Regiment
Lieutenant George Frederick Pykett, Royal Warwickshire Regiment
Temp Lieutenant Charles Henry Quin, 7th Battalion, Royal Inniskilling Fusiliers, attd. 34th Battalion, London Regiment
Lieutenant Edward Ralph, Royal Garrison Artillery, attd. 210th Siege Battery
Captain Edward Ramsden, 5th Lancers
Captain William Havelock Chaplin Ramsden, East Yorkshire Regiment, attd. 35th Battalion, Machine Gun Corps
Lieutenant Charles Thompson Ranken, Royal Field Artillery
Lieutenant Thomas Frederick Rawle, South Wales Borderers, attd. 1st Battalion
Lieutenant John Brannan Raymond, 3/6th Battalion, East Surrey Regiment, attd. 1/5th Battalion, Nottinghamshire and Derbyshire Regiment
Lieutenant Sidney Read, 1/5th Battalion, London Regiment
Temp Captain Charles Reginald Reckitt, Royal Army Medical Corps, attd. 26th Brigade, Royal Field Artillery
Lieutenant Charles Edward Reed, 64th Siege Battery, Royal Garrison Artillery
Lieutenant Frederick Reid, Signal Section, Royal Engineers, attd. V. Corps, Heavy Artillery
Lieutenant Alexander Frederick Gordon Renton, 11th Hussars
Temp Captain William Wylie Rentoul, East Lancashire Regiment, attd. 1/4th Battalion, Shropshire Light Infantry
Temp Captain Ernest Percy Reynolds, 37th Signal Company, Royal Engineers
Captain Henry Edward Sutherland Richards  2/1st West Lancaster Field Ambulance, Royal Army Medical Corps
Temp Lieutenant William Watson Richards, Royal Army Ordnance Depot
2nd Lieutenant Roy Hurley Rickard, Royal Garrison Artillery, attd. 120th Siege Battery
Rev. James Sidney Dundas Rider, Royal Army Chaplains' Department, attd. 19th Hussars
Temp Captain Thomas Kenneth Gordon Ridley, 17th Battalion, Worcestershire Regiment, formerly 12th Battalion, Yorkshire Regiment
Lieutenant Thomas Rigby, attd. 77th Brigade, Royal Field Artillery
Lieutenant Joseph Maitland Ripley, Royal Artillery, attd. I. Battery, Royal Horse Artillery
Lieutenant John George Ferrier Robb, Royal Garrison Artillery, attd. 286th Siege Battery, Royal Garrison Artillery
Temp Captain Algernon Bruce Pryor Roberts, General List, attd. Tank Corps
Temp Captain David Robertson, General List
Captain Duncan Irvine Robertson, 1/7th Battalion, Argyll and Sutherland Highlanders
Lieutenant John Robertson, Cameron Highlanders, attd. 1st Battalion 240017
Company Sergeant Major Arthur Robinson, 1/6th Battalion, Liverpool Regiment
Lieutenant Claude Robinson, Royal Field Artillery
Captain Douglas Charles Robinson, Royal Lancaster Regiment
Rev. Edgar Vivian Robinson, Royal Army Chaplains' Department, attd. 1st Battalion, South Wales Borderers
Temp Captain Falkland Robinson, 30th Brigade, Royal Garrison Artillery
2nd Lieutenant Harry Hambrook Robinson, 24th Battalion, Machine Gun Corps
Rev. Daniel Roche, Royal Army Chaplains' Department, attd. 7/8th Battalion, Royal Inniskilling Fusiliers
Captain Frederick Ernest Woodham Rogers, 2/3rd (Home Counties) Field Ambulance, Royal Army Medical Corps
Temp Lieutenant Frederic Houghton Rogers, 255th Tunneling Company, Royal Engineers
Rev. Louis Rogers, Royal Army Chaplains' Department, attd. 38th Labour Group
Captain Leonard Ropner, Royal Garrison Artillery, attd. 308th Siege Battery
Captain Clarence Henry Rose, 5th Battalion, Yorkshire Regiment, attd. 51st Battalion, Machine Gun Corps
Temp Lieutenant Edward Andrew Ross, 13th Battalion, Manchester Regiment, attd. 1/8th Battalion
Lieutenant John Ross, Royal Garrison Artillery, attd. 200th Siege Battery
Temp Quartermaster and Captain Reginald Henry Rossiter, 10th Battalion, Royal Warwickshire Regiment
Lieutenant George Noel Royce, Nottinghamshire and Derbyshire Regiment, attd. 42nd Battalion, Machine Gun Corps
Lieutenant Arthur Eaton Rusher, 378th Battery, 169th Brigade, Royal Field Artillery
Lieutenant Godfrey Laird Rutherford, 5th Battalion, Durh
2nd Lieutenant John Sabiston, Royal Field Artillery, attd. B/311th (West Riding) Brigade, Royal Field Artillery
Captain James Roy Saidler, Royal Garrison Artillery, attd. 70th Brigade
Lieutenant Owen Jeremy Sangar, Royal Garrison Artillery, attd. Heavy Artillery, 8th Corps
Temp Lieutenant Reginald Henry Sawyer, Royal Marine Artillery
Lieutenant Lyle Cooper Schlotel, Royal Garrison Artillery, attd. 263rd Siege Battery
Lieutenant Alexander Balfour Scott, Royal Field Artillery, attd. Headquarters, 32nd Divisional Artillery
Rev. Andrew Boyd Scott  Royal Army Chaplains' Department
Lieutenant Aubrey Heylyn Scott, Royal Field Artillery, attd. Headquarters, 15th Brigade, Royal Field Artillery
Temp Lieutenant Wilfred Scurr, E. Corps Signal Company, Royal Engineers
Temp Captain Albert Harold Searl, 17th Battalion, Royal Welsh Fusiliers
Lieutenant Richard Wilcock Sellers, Middlesex Regiment
Sergeant Major John Sephton, 2nd Battalion, Nottinghamshire and Derbyshire Regiment
Temp Lieutenant George Colby Sharpin, 1st Battalion, Bedfordshire Regiment
Temp Lieutenant Egbert-Wilfred George Simpson, 63rd Battalion, Machine Gun Corps
Temp Lieutenant James Herfeert-Simpson, 16th Battalion, Royal Irish Rifles
Lieutenant Charles Alan Slatford, Royal Garrison Artillery, attd. 133rd Siege Battery
Temp Captain Arthur Boyson Slee, Royal Field Artillery, attd. O. A.A. Battery
Company Sergeant Major Thomas John Sloley  9th Battalion, Machine Gun Corps
Lieutenant John Edward Smales, 9th Battalion, Durham Light Infantry
Lieutenant Frank Barton Smith, 1/12th Battalion, North Lancashire Regiment
Temp Captain Frederick William Smith, General List
Temp Captain Kenneth Percival Smith, 5th Battalion, Northamptonshire Regiment
Temp Quartermaster and Lieutenant Thomas Smith, 11th Battalion, Royal Lancaster Regiment
Captain Norman Smithers, 4th Battalion, Royal West Kent Regiment
2nd Lieutenant Walter Thomas Snelling, Royal Field Artillery, attd. D/189th Brigade, Royal Field Artillery
Lieutenant Thomas William Snow, C/286th (West Lancaster) Brigade, Royal Field Artillery
Temp Lieutenant William Samuel Stebbing, 16th Battalion, Royal Warwickshire Regiment
Temp Lieutenant William Steele, 15th Battalion, Highland Light Infantry
Lieutenant John Stenson, Headquarters, 18th Brigade, Royal Garrison Artillery
Captain Ronald William Stevenson, 8th Battalion, Worcestershire Regiment
Temp Captain George Innes Stewart, 8th Battalion, Royal Highlanders, attd. 26th Light Trench Mortar Battery
Lieutenant Henry John Edwin Stinson, Royal Garrison Artillery, attd. 11th Heavy Battery, Royal Garrison Artillery
Captain Ralph Lambton Stobart, 1/1st Northumberland Hussars
Quartermaster and Captain Vyvyan Ernest Stock, 1st Battalion, Middlesex Regiment
Temp Captain Stanley Parke Stoker  Royal Army Medical Corps, attd. 1/6th Battalion, West Riding Regiment
2nd Lieutenant Robert Sebastian Stott, 5th Battalion, Lancashire Fusiliers, attd. 10th Battalion
Temp Captain Thomas Dudley Steward, General List
Lieutenant John Robert Shuckburgh Stranack, Seaforth Highlanders, attd. 9th Battalion
Lieutenant John Stephens Stranaghan, Honourable Artillery Company
Company Sergeant Major John Stuart  7th Battalion, Gordon Highlanders
Temp Lieutenant Eric Owen Stubbings, 247th Field Company, Royal Engineers
Temp Captain Douglas Stewart-Tailyour, B/94th Brigade, Royal Field Artillery
Temp Lieutenant Henry Tatham, 256th Tunneling Company, Royal Engineers
Lieutenant Lewin Graham Mackworth Taverner, Royal Field Artillery, attd. 59th Brigade, Royal Field Artillery
Captain Arthur Turner Taylor, 1/2nd Battalion, London Regiment
Captain David Taylor, 51st Divisional Train, Royal Army Service Corps
2nd Lieutenant Harold Edgar Taylor, Royal Field Artillery
Lieutenant Robert Emery Taylor, Middlesex Regiment
Lieutenant Roy Stanhope Tennent, 6th Battalion, North Staffordshire Regiment
Lieutenant John Leslie Tetlow, 1/7th Battalion, West Riding Regiment
Temp Captain Leonard Samuel Henry Thomas, 19th Battalion, Welsh Regiment
Lieutenant William George Thomas, 1st (London) Brigade, Royal Field Artillery, attd. B/77th Brigade, Royal Field Artillery
Lieutenant Mervyn Edward Stanley Thompson, Headquarters, 169th Brigade, Royal Field Artillery
Lieutenant Robert Nathaniel Thompson, 4th Battalion, Yorkshire Light Infantry
Lieutenant Charles Ferguson Thomson, Highland Division, Royal Engineers
Lieutenant Thomas Bentley Stewart Thomson, 9th Battalion, Highland Light Infantry, secd. to Royal Engineers
Temp 2nd Lieutenant Fred Thurlby, 200th Field Company, Royal Engineers
Sergeant Major William Tilbury, 5th Battalion, Royal Berkshire Regiment
Captain Herbert Charles Coningsby Tippet, 4th Battalion, Royal Dublin Fusiliers
Lieutenant Edward le Marchant Trafford, 1st Life Guards, attd. No. 1 (1st Life Guards) Battalion, Guards Machine Gun Regiment
Captain Robert Cecil Trousdale  South Lancashire Regiment
Temp Captain Henry Tudsbery Tudsbery, Royal Engineers
Lieutenant Roger William Turnbull, 5th (London) Brigade, Royal Field Artillery
Lieutenant Gerald Unsworth, Royal Warwickshire Regiment, attd. 1/4th Battalion, York & Lancaster Regiment
Captain Croxton Sillery Vale, Royal Army Service Corps, attd. Heavy Artillery, XV. Corps
Captain Claude Max Vallentin, 27th Battery, 32nd Brigade, Royal Field Artillery
Temp Lieutenant Percy Keough Vere, 19th Battalion, Machine Gun Corps
Lieutenant Wilfred Clement Von Berg, 1/0th Battalion, London Regiment
Captain Ralph Ernest Vyvyan, Worcestershire Regiment, attd. Royal Engineers
Lieutenant Francis Vyvyan-Robinson, Royal Engineers, attd. 1st Siege Company
Temp Captain George Gordon Waddington, 444th Siege Battery, Royal Garrison Artillery
Lieutenant Francis Harold Waite, 5th Battalion, West Riding Regiment
Dt. Charles William Walker, 58th (London) Divisional Signal Company, Royal Engineers
Quartermaster and Captain George Henry Wall, 3rd Battalion, Grenadier Guards
Quartermaster and Captain John Richard Wall, 2/8th Battalion, Worcestershire Regiment
Lieutenant Alexander Steven Wallace, Royal Field Artillery, attd. Headquarters, 46th Brigade, Royal Field Artillery
Temp Lieutenant Frederic Ritchie Walls, 49th (West Riding) Divisional Signals Company, Royal Engineers
Temp Lieutenant Holwell Hely Hutchinson Walshe, Headquarters, 9th Brigade, Royal Field Artillery
Lieutenant Franz Wilfrid Walter, Royal Garrison Artillery, attd. 119th Siege Battery
Lieutenant David John Walters, Royal Garrison Artillery, attd. Headquarters, 49th Brigade
Captain Bertrand Thomas Ward, 19th Battalion, London Regiment
Lieutenant John Leveson Ward, Nottinghamshire and Derbyshire Regiment
Lieutenant Leslie Rushworth Ward, 113th Heavy Battery, Royal Garrison Artillery
Temp Captain Thomas Leonard Ward, General List
Battery Sergeant Major Joseph Henry Ware, D/79th Brigade, Royal Field Artillery
Lieutenant Edward Price Warlters, Royal Garrison Artillery, attd. 256th Siege Battery, Royal Garrison Artillery
Temp Lieutenant Joseph Henry Watkins, No. 81 Motor Amb. Section, Royal Engineers
Lieutenant Arthur Cecil Burness Watts, 9th Battalion, Middlesex Regiment, Seed. Signal Service, Royal Engineers
Captain Charles Edward Wauhope, 400th Battery, Royal Field Artillery
Lieutenant Aynsley Mills Webster, Royal Field Artillery, attd. Signal Sub-Section, 119th A. Brigade, Royal Field Artillery
Lieutenant Alfred Bernard Weekes, B/180th Brigade, Royal Field Artillery
Captain David Henderson Weir, Royal Army Medical Corps, attd. 112th Field Ambulance
Lieutenant William Arthur Welch, 66th (East Lancaster) Divisional Train, Royal Army Service Corps
Lieutenant Charles William Welton, Royal Garrison Artillery, attd. 278th Siege Battery, Royal Garrison Artillery
Temp 2nd Lieutenant Gordon Leake White, 12th Battalion, East Surrey Regiment
Temp Captain Brian Whitehead, Royal Army Medical Corps, attd. 59th Divn. HQ
Temp Lieutenant Angus McIntosh Whyte, 2nd Battalion, Tank Corps
2nd Lieutenant Owen Arthur Widdowson, Royal Garrison Artillery, attd. 484th Siege Battery, Royal Garrison Artillery
Temp 2nd Lieutenant Percy Wild, 108th Labour Company, Labour Corps
Temp Captain William Henry Albert Wilkins, 10th Battalion, South Wales Borderers
Lieutenant Dudley Williams, Royal Field Artillery, attd. 4th Army A.A. Defences
Temp Captain Herbert Farrar Williams, 11th Battalion, East Yorkshire Regiment
Lieutenant Keith Williams, Royal Garrison Artillery, attd. 158th Siege Battery, Royal Garrison Artillery
Temp 2nd Lieutenant Thomas Williams, 34th Battalion, Machine Gun Corps
Captain George Arthur Wilmot, Royal Warwickshire Regiment, attd. 15th Battalion
Captain Charles Watts Wilson, 2/6th Battalion, Liverpool Regiment
Lieutenant Gerald Temple Wilson, Royal Field Artillery, attd. T. A.A. Battery
Temp 2nd Lieutenant James Hourston Wilson, No. 9 Foreway Company, Royal Engineers
Lieutenant Sydney Grahame Wilson, 2/14th Battalion, London Regiment
Sergeant Major Joseph William Windmill  16th Battalion, Royal Warwickshire Regiment
Lieutenant Henry Dacres Wise, 18th Hussars
Gerald Fergus Wood, Royal Engineers
Lieutenant Noel Edward Walter Wood, Royal Field Artillery
Lieutenant Tom Wood, 7th Dragoon Guards, attd. Tank Corps
Captain Richard Montague Wootten, 6th Innis Dragoons
Lieutenant Robert Douglas Worrall, Royal Horse Artillery, attd. D/298th Brigade, Royal Field Artillery
Lieutenant Samuel Worrall, Royal Garrison Artillery, attd. 277th Siege Battery, Royal Garrison Artillery
Temp Captain Ralph Marcus Meaburn Worsley, Royal Garrison Artillery, attd. 1/2nd Lancaster Heavy Battery, Royal Garrison Artillery
Temp Captain Ralph Heron Worthington, General List
Sergeant Major William John Wrapson, 6th Battalion, Dorsetshire Regiment
Quartermaster and Captain William Bertie Wray, 1/22nd Battalion, London Regiment
Lieutenant Arthur Edward James Wright, 16th Battery, 41st Brigade, Royal Field Artillery
Temp Lieutenant David Porter Wright, 2nd Battalion, Scottish Rifles
2nd Lieutenant John William Wright, Lincolnshire Regiment, attd. 1st Battalion
Captain Philip Arton Wright, 62nd (West Riding) Divisional Train, Royal Army Service Corps
Temp Captain John Wylie  Royal Army Medical Corps, attd. 6th Battalion, East Yorkshire Regiment
Lieutenant Thomas Henry Yalden, 1st Battalion, East Surrey Regiment
Lieutenant Arthur Edward Yapp, Headquarters, 47th Brigade, Royal Garrison Artillery
Temp Captain Geoffrey Arthur Douglas Youl, attd. 159th Brigade, Royal Field Artillery
Temp Lieutenant Alfred Young, 15th Battalion, Durham Light Infantry
Temp Captain John Edgar Young, Royal Army Veterinary Corps, attd. Headquarters, 34th Brigade, Royal Field Artillery
Temp Lieutenant John Stirling Young, 1st Battalion, Royal Highlanders
Lieutenant Norman Harold Zimmern, 1/8th Battalion, Lancashire Fusiliers

Canadian Force
Honorary Captain Frank Guy Armitage, Canadian Young Men's Christian Association Services
Lieutenant James Ballantyne, Royal Canadian Regiment, Nova Scotia Regiment
Quartermaster and Captain Thomas Barclay, 13th Canadian Field Ambulance, Canadian Army Medical Corps
Captain Kenneth Hubert Bovill, Canadian Field Artillery, Headquarters, 5th Canadian Division Artillery
Lieutenant Charles Chandler Brooks, Canadian Machine Gun Corps, attd. Intelligence Corps
Lieutenant John William Moore Carey, 78th Battalion, Canadian Infantry
Captain John Hawland Chipman, 15th Battalion, Canadian Infantry
Honorary Captain James Clarke, Canadian Young Men's Christian Association Services
Lieutenant Harry Frederick Charles Cocks, 5th Canadian Mounted Rifles Battalion
Temp Captain Edward Francis Coke, 8th Battalion, Canadian Infantry
Honorary Captain John William Coupe, Royal Canadian Regiment, Nova Scotia Regiment
Captain Veysie Curran, 27th Battalion, Canadian Infantry
Temp Lieutenant Vladimir Curtis, 24th Battalion, Canadian Infantry
Captain Francis Murray Daweon, 8th Battalion, Canadian Engineers
Lieutenant Alexandre Deslauriers, 22nd Battalion, Canadian Infantry
Captain Geoffrey Noel Douglas, 2nd Canadian Machine Gun Corps
Lieutenant James Lewis Duncan, Canadian Field Artillery
Captain James Ewen Eastlake, Canadian Field Artillery
Captain William Arthur Grafftey, 42nd Battalion, Canadian Infantry
Captain Alexander Aitken Gray, 76th Battalion, Canadian Infantry
Temp Captain Bernard Cecil Hall  3rd Tunneling Company, Canadian Engineers
Temp Captain Stanley Horace Hawkins, 10th Battalion, Canadian Engineers
Lieutenant Arthur Ernest Hopper, 1st Heavy Battery, Canadian Garrison Artillery
Captain Eric Ian Henry Ings, 3rd Battalion, Canadian Machine Gun Corps
Sergeant Major James Kay  16th Battalion, Canadian Infantry
Captain Edwin John Lovelace, 4th Canadian Divisional Artillery Column, Canadian Field Artillery
Lieutenant Findlay Malcolm Macdonald, 4th Battalion, Canadian Machine Gun Corps
Captain Colin MacKay, 12th Siege Battery, Canadian Garrison Artillery
Honorary Captain John George McKay, Canadian Young Men's Christian Association Services
Lieutenant John James MacKenzie, 8th A. Brigade, Canadian Field Artillery
Captain Gordon Allison Medcalfe, Canadian Garrison Artillery, sec. to 443rd S. Battery, Royal Garrison Artillery
Captain Donald Stanley Montgomery, 29th Battalion, Canadian Infantry
Temp Captain William McLeod Moore, 46th Battalion, Canadian Infantry
Captain Arthur McIntyre Morrison  6th Battalion, Canadian Engineers
Lieutenant Lennox Pelham Napier, Canadian Field Artillery
Captain Henry Grattan Nolan, 49th Battalion, Canadian Infantry
Lieutenant Herbert Braid Northwood, 78th Battalion, Canadian Infantry
Lieutenant James Paterson, 1st Canadian Mounted Rifles Battalion
Lieutenant Harry Leslie Petrie, 44th Battalion, Canadian Infantry
Quartermaster and Captain Gordon Barry Pierce, 50th Battalion, Canadian Infantry
Captain Thomas Hall Plumer, Canadian Army Service Corps
Quartermaster and Major James Pringle, 26th Battalion, Canadian Infantry
Captain Anthony Meredith Reid, 2nd Battalion, Canadian Engineers
Temp Captain Alfred Hubert Rowberry, 2nd Battalion, Canadian Mounted Rifles
Captain Gerald Stuart Rutherford, 52nd Battalion, Canadian Infantry
Captain Reginald George Saunders, Headquarters, 2nd Brigade, Canadian Engineers
Lieutenant Edward Baldwin Savage, Canadian Field Artillery
Lieutenant Ezra William Savage, 3rd A.T. Company, Canadian Engineers
Captain Harry Wilson Scruton, Western Ontario Regiment, Canadian Infantry
Lieutenant Cecil Randolph Sircom, Canadian Field Artillery, attd. E. Battery, Canadian A.A. Battery
Captain Stanley Morse Smith, 4th Canadian Division, Signal Company, Canadian Engineers
Captain Ernest Arthur Steer, 4th Battalion, Canadian Mounted Rifles
Captain Ronald Douglas Sutherland, Headquarters, 4th Brigade, Canadian Engineers
Lieutenant Nigel Drury Theobald, 7th Battalion, Canadian Infantry
Captain Reginald Jabez Vickers, Canadian Army Veterinary Corps, 2nd Canadian M.V.S.
Captain Harold Chandos Walcot, 43rd Battalion, Canadian Infantry
Captain William McLean Walwyn, 102nd Battalion, Canadian Infantry
Captain Francis Surridge Williams, 1st Tramways Company, Canadian Engineers
Captain Henry Royal Williams, 116th Battalion, Canadian Infantry

Australian Imperial Force
Lieutenant Phillip Lewis Aitken, 37th Battalion, Australian Infantry
Lieutenant Laurence Wendover Barnett, 40th Battalion, Australian Infantry
Lieutenant Percy Aubrey Bull, 32nd Battalion, Australian Infantry
Lieutenant Harry James Burnett, 1st Brigade, Australian Field Artillery
Lieutenant Allan George Macleod Burns, 4th Australian Divisional Signals Company, Australian Engineers
Quartermaster and Captain Laurence Cadell, 49th Battalion, Australian Infantry
Captain Eustace James Colliver, 43rd Battalion, Australian Infantry
Lieutenant Richard Cooper, 2nd Australian Divisional Train, Australian Army Service Corps
Lieutenant Edward Richard Cox, 2nd Australian Divisional Train, Australian Army Service Corps
Captain Noel Millar Cuthbert, 2nd Battalion, Australian Infantry
Lieutenant James Davidson, 10th Battalion, Australian Infantry
Quartermaster and Captain Geoffrey Egg, 11th Battalion, Australian Infantry
Captain George Frederick Fitzgerald, 5th Battalion, Australian Machine Gun Corps
Quartermaster and Captain Edward Freeman, 8th Battalion, Australian Infantry
Captain Alfred Victor Gallasch, 27th Battalion, Australian Infantry
Captain Keith Irvine Gill, 1st Battalion, Australian Machine Gun Corps
Quartermaster and Captain Thomas Robin Hammond, 48th Battalion, Australian Infantry
Lieutenant Leslie Elliot Harding, 50th Battalion, Australian Infantry
Lieutenant Geoffrey Koeppen Henderson  48th Battalion, Australian Infantry
Lieutenant Cyril Bruce Hislop, 6th Australian Infantry, Brigade Headquarters
Lieutenant Paul William Hopkins, 4th Battalion, Australian Machine Gun Corps
Captain Max Ulrich Hubbe, 1st Australian Pioneer Battalion
Captain Milton Livingstone Fredericks Jarvie, Australian Prov. Corps
Captain Clarence Walter Lay, 59th Battalion, Australian Infantry
Captain Norman John MacKay, Australian Army Medical Corps attd. 55th Battalion, Australian Infantry
Captain David MacKey, 3rd Battalion, Australian Machine Gun Corps
Lieutenant James Joseph Malone, Australian Flying Corps
Captain Allan Neil McLennan, 2nd Battalion, Australian Machine Gun Corps
Captain Donald McLeod, 12th Battalion, Australian Infantry
Lieutenant Frederick Brayshaw McWhannell, 57th Battalion, Australian Infantry
Captain Albert Colin Morris, 3rd Tunneling Company, Australian Engineers
Lieutenant John Wesley Mott  7th Field Company, Australian Engineers
Lieutenant David Montague Muir, 8th Battalion, Australian Infantry, attd. 2nd Light Trench Mortar Battery
Lieutenant Henry Herbert Neaves, 45th Battalion, Australian Infantry
Lieutenant Roy McRae Pattie, 1st Australian Divisional Artillery Column, Australian Field Artillery
Lieutenant Thomas Giles Paul, 6th Battalion, Australian Infantry
Quartermaster and Captain Collison Clapham Pearson, 53rd Battalion, Australian Infantry
Lieutenant Hugh Frank Pennefather, 56th Battalion, Australian Infantry
Quartermaster and Captain Edgar Ewart Plucknett, 13th Battalion, Australian Infantry
Lieutenant George Fox Priestley, 11th Battalion, Australian Infantry
Captain Douglas Frank Kae, 2nd Battalion, Australian Machine Gun Corps
Lieutenant Leonard Victor Reid, 13th Australian Light Horse Regiment
Lieutenant John Bade, 2nd Australian Pioneer Battalion
Lieutenant Harry Bobbins, 38th Battalion, Australian Infantry
Captain Septimus Archdale Robertson, 4th Australian Divisional Train, Australian Army Service Corps
Lieutenant Edwin Charles Rogers, 44th Battalion, Australian Infantry
Lieutenant Frank Rogerson, 3rd Field Company, Australian Engineers
Captain Francis Palmer Selleck, 24th Battalion, Australian Infantry
Captain George Leslie Smith, 2nd Tunneling Company, Australian Engineers
Lieutenant John Morrison Smith, 2nd Australian Divisional Signals Company, Australian Engineers
Lieutenant Walter Willoughby Smith, 33rd Battalion, Australian Infantry, attd. 9th Australian Light Trench Mortar Battery
Lieutenant George Holmes Thornton, 4th Australian Pioneer Battalion
Lieutenant Theodore Glyn Watkins, 51st Battalion, Australian Infantry
Captain Nelson Frederick Wellington, 21st Battalion, Australian Infantry
Lieutenant Lawrence Joseph West, 6th A. Brigade, Australian Field Artillery
Lieutenant Roland William Wild, 4th Australian Pioneer Battalion
Captain Owen Beresford Williams, 11th Field Company, Australian Engineers
Rev. Bicton Clemence Wilson  Australian Army Chaplains' Department, attd. 1st Brigade, Australian Imperial Force

New Zealand Force
Lieutenant Erasmus Baxter, 1st New Zealand Rifle Brigade
2nd Lieutenant Arthur William Brown  New Zealand Machine Gun Corps
Captain Robert Henry Daldy, New Zealand Engineers
Captain Norman Harrison Dempster  New Zealand Medical Corps, attd. 3rd Battalion, New Zealand Rifle Brigade
Rev. David Craig Herron, New Zealand Chaplains' Department, attd. 2nd Otago Regiment
Captain Maurice George Robert Newbould, 1st Field Company, New Zealand Engineers
Captain Edward Tingey, New Zealand Maori Battalion
Rev. Charles Walls, New Zealand Chaplains' Department, attd. 2nd Battalion, Wellington Regiment
Captain Alexander Duncan Shanks Whyte, New Zealand Medical Corps, attd. 2nd Brigade Headquarters, New Zealand Field Artillery

South African Force
Temp 2nd Lieutenant Francis Jean Van Halsland Duminy, 73rd Siege Battery, Royal Garrison Artillery (South African Horse Artillery)
Lieutenant George Percy Ingarfield, 1st Battalion, South African Infantry

For distinguished service in connection with Military Operations in Egypt: 
2nd Lieutenant Edward William Alderson, 2/10th Battalion, Middlesex Regiment
Lieutenant George Hubert Allanson, Indian Army Reserve of Officers, attd. 2nd Battalion, Gurkha Rifles
Lieutenant Bryan Archer, 1/5th Battalion, Essex Regiment
Lieutenant Charles Walter Back, Norfolk Regiment, attd. 1/4th Battalion, Norfolk Regiment
Lieutenant Thomas James Bailey, Royal Field Artillery, attd. Headquarters, 302nd Brigade
Temp Lieutenant Albert John Beach, attd. Essex Regiment (1/4th Battalion)
Lieutenant Edward Brymer Belcher, Indian Army Reserve of Officers
Lieutenant Philip Manley Bendall, 2/19th Battalion, London Regiment
Captain Ivan Benton, 314th Siege Battery, Royal Garrison Artillery
Captain John Herd Beverland  Royal Army Medical Corps, attd. 165th Indian combined Field Ambulance
Temp Captain Wentworth Percival Bewicke, General List, attd. Headquarters, 31st Infantry Brigade
Captain William Frederick Blacker, 36th Jacobs Horse, Indian Army
Lieutenant Alexander Edwin Blair, Royal Highlanders, attd. 2nd Battalion
Lieutenant Gerald Stuart Blake, Royal Field Artillery, attd. 270th Brigade
Captain Leslie Cecil Blackmore Bowker, 2/14th Battalion, London Regiment, attd. Royal Engineers
2nd Lieutenant Herbert Braine, attd. Imperial Camel Corps
Lieutenant Edward James Stanford Loftus Brooke, 2/4th Battalion, Hampshire Regiment, attd. 233rd Infantry Brigade Headquarters
Captain Harold Septimus Burn, 436th Field Company, Royal Engineers
Captain Reginald Alfred Carr-White, 31st Lancers, attd. 9th Hodson's Horse
Captain Howard Charles Bobert Caudle, Royal Garrison Artillery, attd. 262nd Brigade, Royal Field Artillery
Lieutenant George Duncan Clarke, Hyderabad Imperial Service Lancers
Lieutenant Thomas Edwin Clements, Royal Field Artillery, attd. 428th Battery
Lieutenant Godfrey William Collier, Royal West Surrey Regiment, attd. 2/13th Battalion, London Regiment
Captain Guy Cooper-Willis, 2/20th Battalion, London Regiment
Lieutenant Charles Neville Christian Copeman, 2nd Battalion, Leicestershire Regiment
Temp Lieutenant Neville Mortimer Corke, attd. Royal West Surrey Regiment, Comdg. 160th Trench Mortar Battery
Lieutenant James Patrick Coyle, 2/21st Battalion, London Regiment
Lieutenant Frederick Crawford, 2nd Battalion, Royal Irish Fusiliers
Captain Egerton Tymewell Cripps, Gloucestershire Yeomanry
Temp Surgeon-Captain Aldington George Curphey, 2nd Battalion, British West Indian Regiment
Lieutenant John Baymond Danson, 1/4th Battalion, Cheshire Regiment
Temp Captain Stephen Davies, 14th Army Troops, Royal Engineers
Captain Lancelot Ernest Dennys, 54th Sikhs, Indian Army 
Lieutenant Isaac Pierre de Villiers, Royal Field Artillery, attd. 68th Brigade
2nd Lieutenant John Hunt Dibley, Royal Army Service Corps, attd. Camel Transport Corps
Lieutenant Gregory Augustine Louis Dunphy, 2/21st Battalion, attd. 2/19th Battalion, London Regiment
Temp Lieutenant John Newman Ellis, 1st Heavy Artillery Signal Section, Royal Engineers
Captain William Graham Elphinston, 34th Poona Horse, Indian Army
Temp Captain Gordon John Cruikshank Ferrier, Royal Army Medical Corps, attd. 129th Indian Combined Field Ambulance
Lieutenant Kenneth Mills Fraser, Indian Army Reserve of Officers, attd. 3rd Gurkha Rifles
Lieutenant Thomas Edwin Furze, Indian Army Reserve of Officers, attd. 8th Gurkha Rifles
Lieutenant Edward Gilholme, 21st Lancers, attd. Gloucestershire Yeomanry
Temp Lieutenant Henry Claude Goldsmith, Suffolk Regiment, attd. 1/5th Battalion
Captain William Ernest Goodwin, Royal Field Artillery, attd. B. Battery, 67th Brigade
Captain Charles Edward Grahame, 1st Battalion, Royal Scots Fusiliers
Temp Lieutenant Edward Stanley Greenhill, Machine Gun Corps
Temp Lieutenant Albert Harris, 60th Battalion, Machine Gun Corps
Captain Leslie Price Harris, Royal Army Medical Corps
Lieutenant Harold John Hasler, attd. 121st Pioneers, Indian Army
Captain William Francis Theodore Haultain  Royal Army Medical Corps, attd. 29th Lancers, Indian Army
Temp Lieutenant Roland Henry Hazel, 4th Signal Squadron, Royal Engineers
Captain Charles Frederic William Burton Homan, 1/4th Battalion, Wiltshire Regiment
Lieutenant Nicholas Howard Thomas Homer, Indian Army Reserve of Officers, attd. 23rd Sikh Pioneers
Captain John Walter Hornby, 12th Lancers, attd. 2nd Imperial Camel Corps
Lieutenant Richard John Jane, Royal Field Artillery, attd. 60th Divisional Artillery Column
Captain Reginald Douglas Jebb, 4th Battalion, Royal Sussex Regiment
Lieutenant Herbert Verrier Jones, 1/5th Battalion, Welsh Regiment
Lieutenant Reginald Trevor Jones, Indian Army Reserve of Officers, attd. No. 3 Company
Temp Lieutenant Burjorji H. Kamakaka, Indian Medical Service, attd. 1st Battalion, 123rd Outrams Rifles, Indian Army
2nd Lieutenant George Phillip Kay, Royal Field Artillery, attd. 406th Battery
Captain Angus Menzies Kennedy, 8th Gurkha Rifles, Indian Army
Temp 2nd Lieutenant Duncan Campbell Kerr, General List, attd. Egyptian Labour Corps
Lieutenant Kenneth Francis Kingwell, Royal Field Artillery, attd. 265th Brigade
Temp 2nd Lieutenant Alex. Smeath Kirkbride, Egyptian Labour Corps
2nd Lieutenant Samuel Howard Knight, Somerset Light Infantry, attd. 1/5th Battalion
Captain Hubert Samuel Lane, 18th Battalion, London Regiment
Lieutenant Cecil Arthur Loombe, Royal Field Artillery, attd. 272nd Brigade, Royal Field Artillery
2nd Lieutenant Gilbert Vivian Henderson Mansell, Honourable Artillery Company
Lieutenant Cyril Marwood, 301st Battery, Royal Field Artillery
Temp Lieutenant John Macgregor, 2nd Battalion, Royal Highlanders
Lieutenant Walter Adair MacLellan, 264th Brigade, Royal Field Artillery 
Captain Emil Theodor Maier, 1/5th Battalion, Bedfordshire Regiment
Temp Captain Robert McEwan, 6th Battalion, Royal Irish Fusiliers, attd. 5th Battalion
Temp Lieutenant Charles Melville Melville, attd. Royal Fusiliers, attd. 1/10th Battalion, London Regiment
Lieutenant Stanley Thomas Meudham, 484th (E. Anglian) Field Company, Royal Engineers
Captain Gordon Logan Millar, Scottish Horse Yeomanry and Machine Gun Corps (Cavalry)
Captain Leonard Milton, 2/4th (London) Field Ambulance, Royal Army Medical Corps
Lieutenant Roy Vivian Murray, Royal Inniskilling Fusiliers, attd. 10th Battalion, Machine Gun Corps
Lieutenant Dudley Maurice Newitt, Indian Army Reserve of Officers, attd. 53rd Sikhs, Indian Army
Lieutenant Stanley Guy Notley, 60th Divisional Artillery Column, Royal Field Artillery
Captain Thomas Schomberg Paterson, 19th Lancers, Indian Army
Temp 2nd Lieutenant Edward George Pauley, attd. Middlesex Regiment (2/10th Battalion)
Lieutenant Archibald Lindsey Pavey, Wiltshire Regiment, attd. n8th Battalion, Hampshire Regiment
Temp 2nd Lieutenant Hubert Peake, Shropshire Light Infantry, attd. 1/1st Battalion, Herefordshire Regiment
Captain Victor Cooper Ponsonby, Hertfordshire Yeomanry, attd. XXI. A. Corps Cavalry Regiment
Lieutenant Francis Geoffrey Walmsley Radcliffe, 8th Brigade, Royal Field Artillery
Captain Oswald Alfred Radley, 7th Battalion, Cheshire Regiment
Temp Captain Harry James Rae  Royal Army Medical Corps
Lieutenant Robert Philip Lancaster Ranking, attd. 5th Cavalry, Indian Army
Quartermaster and Major Norman Reid  1st Battalion, Seaforth Highlanders
Temp Captain Francis Charles Robbs, Royal Army Medical Corps, attd. 1st Battalion, Royal Irish Regiment
Temp Lieutenant Donald Herbert Rose, Essex Regiment, attd. 1/6th Battalion
Captain Alan Saunders, Indian Army Reserve of Officers
Lieutenant Robert Sawers, 495th (Kent) Field Company, Royal Engineers
Lieutenant Alastair Graeme Scotland, 36th Sikhs, attd. 51st Sikhs, Indian Army 
Lieutenant Samuel Simpson Seccombe, 1/7th Battalion, Essex Regiment
Captain Norman Sharp, Ayrshire Yeomanry
Temp 2nd Lieutenant Stephen John Sheldon, Royal Army Service Corps, attd. Camel Transport Corps
Lieutenant Francis Lisney Skilton, No. Mtn. Battery, Hong Kong and Singapore Royal Garrison Artillery
Captain Alfred Bernard Pavey Smith, 2/6th Battalion, London Field Ambulance, Royal Army Medical Corps
Lieutenant Charles Stephenson, Lincolnshire Yeomanry and Machine Gun Corps (Cavalry)
Temp Lieutenant William Arthur Strange, 5th Battalion, Royal Irish Fusiliers, attd. 2nd Battalion
Lieutenant Arthur William Street, 8th Battalion, Hampshire Regiment (T.F.V attd. 75th Battalion, Machine Gun Corps
Lieutenant Noel Rothwell Taitt, 1/16th Battalion, attd. 1/5th Battalion, Bedfordshire Regiment, attd. 162nd Light Trench Mortar Battery
Lieutenant Lionel Bruce Taylor, C/303rd Battery, Royal Field Artillery
Temp Lieutenant Cuthbert Raymond Forster Threlfall, Royal Engineers, attd. 5th Cavalry Divisional Signal Squadron
Temp Lieutenant Walter Travis, attd. Yorkshire Light Infantry, attd. 1/4th Battalion, Northamptonshire Regiment
Quartermaster and Captain Christopher Joseph Trollope, 2/16th Battalion, London Regiment
Lieutenant Charles Henning Turner, 519th Field Company, Royal Engineers
Quartermaster and Captain Thomas Appleby Tutin, 111th Battalion, London Regiment
Temp Lieutenant Ronald Whithair Vigers, K.K. Cable Section, Royal Engineers
Lieutenant Cyril Herbert Walker, 1/5th Battalion, Norfolk Regiment
Lieutenant Wilfrid Arthur Ward, Lancashire Fusiliers, and 60th Battalion, Machine Gun Corps
Captain George Bevil Hastings Wheeler, 21st Lancers
Captain Harold Samuel White, 1/1st (Somerset) Royal Horse Artillery, attd. 1/1st Inverness Royal Horse Artillery
Lieutenant Howard Belmont White, 4th Battalion, Welsh Regiment
Lieutenant William Haughton Whittington, 60th Divisional Train, Royal Army Service Corps
Captain Austin Henry Williams, 38th C. Indian Horse, Indian Army
Lieutenant Gerald Berkeley Wills, 23rd Battalion, London Regiment
2nd Lieutenant James Wylie, 10th Mtn. Battery, Royal Garrison Artillery
Lieutenant Cyril Jeffries Wood, 5th Battalion, East Kent Regiment, attd. 2/4th Battalion, Royal West Kent Regiment (I.F.)
Canadian Force
Lieutenant James Roe Cockburn, 2nd Central Ontario Regiment, secd. 7th Field Survey Company, Royal Engineers
Australian Imperial Force
Captain Colin Anderson, 4th Australian Light Horse Field Ambulance, Australian Army Medical Corps
Lieutenant Charles Joseph Clifford, 11th Australian Light Horse Regiment
Captain John Fortescue Grantley Fitzhardinge, Australian Army Medical Corps, attd. 5th Australian Light Horse Regiment
Captain Henry Hackney, 1st Australian Machine Gun Squadron
Lieutenant George Alexander Harrison, 4th Field Troop, 2nd Field Squadron, Australian Engineers
Captain Edward John Howells, D Field Troop, Australian Engineers
Captain Ernest Homewood James, 1st Australian Armd. Car Battery, Australian Machine Gun Corps
Captain Ernest Marshall Luxmoore, 9th Australian Light Horse Regiment
Lieutenant Frederick Matthews, 1st Anzac Camel Battalion, Imperial Camel Corps
Lieutenant Frank William Nivison, 2nd Australian Machine Gun Squadron, attd. 2nd Australian Light Horse Brigade
Captain George Charles Page, Australian Army Veterinary Corps, attd. 1st Signal Squadron, Australian Engineers
Lieutenant Allison Goodlet Dight Walker, 6th Australian Light Horse Regiment
New Zealand Force
Captain Alexander Cameron. Monteith Finlayson, Auckland Mounted Kit. Regiment
Lieutenant Sinclair Chapman Reid, Auckland Mounted Rifles Regiment
Captain Arthur Ernest Timaru Rhodes, Canterbury Mounted Rifles
Lieutenant Robert Sutherland, Wellington Mounted Rifles Regiment
South African Force
Captain Thomas Brace, 1st South African Field Artillery Brigade

For services rendered in connection with Military Operations in Italy:
Lieutenant Cecil James Frederick Abbott, 2nd Battalion, Honourable Artillery Company
Lieutenant George Wyman Abbott, 1/7th Battalion, Royal Warwickshire Regiment
Lieutenant Arthur Alleri, 1/7th Battalion, Worcestershire Regiment, attd. 144th Trench Mortar Battery
Temp Captain Edward Elston Appleyard, General List, formerly Yorkshire Regiment
Temp Captain Harry Appleyard, 7th Divisional Train, Royal Army Service Corps
Captain John Brian Wilson Ash, 1/7th Battalion, Royal Warwickshire Regiment
Lieutenant Thomas William Barratt, 475th (South Midland) Field Company, Royal Engineers
Temp Captain Frederick Barrett, 8th Battalion, Yorkshire Light Infantry
Lieutenant Douglas Dollin Bassett, Headquarters, 48th (S.M.) Division, Royal Field Artillery
Lieutenant Frank Beverley, Royal Garrison Artillery, attd. 19th Heavy Battery
Lieutenant Francis John Biddulph, Royal Engineers, attd. HQ 68th Infantry Brigade
Lieutenant Hugh Voce Bradford  137th Siege Battery, Royal Garrison Artillery
Temp 2nd Lieutenant Albert Sydney Bridgewater, 9th Battalion, Devonshire Regiment
Temp 2nd Lieutenant Sidney Bryant, Gloucestershire Regiment, attd. 1/5th Battalion
Company Sergeant Major Edgar Buckingham, 1/4th Battalion, Oxfordshire & Buckinghamshire Light Infantry
Temp Captain Albert Cyril Holcombe Calvert, 8th Battalion, York & Lancaster Regiment
Lieutenant John Gordon Campbell, 2nd Battalion, Border Regiment
2nd Lieutenant Charles Henry Chaffer, 1/4th Battalion, Gloucestershire Regiment
Temp Lieutenant Hugh Howard Vivian Christie, Royal Field Artillery
Temp Captain William Freeman Cooper, 8th Battalion, Devonshire Regiment
Captain Raymond Kyle Cotter, Royal Field Artillery, attd. 240th Brigade, Royal Field Artillery
Temp 2nd Lieutenant James Edwin Crooks, 12th Battalion, Durham Light Infantry, attd. 68th Light Trench Mortar Battery
Captain Geoffrey Fenwick Jocelyn Cumberlege  Oxfordshire & Buckinghamshire Light Infantry
Lieutenant George Frederick Dakin, 4th Battalion, York & Lancaster Regiment, attd. 8th Battalion
Lieutenant Henry Wallis Dixon, Royal Garrison Artillery, attd. 317th Siege Battery
Lieutenant William Edward Pears Done, 5th Battalion, Royal Sussex Regiment
Lieutenant Alec Neville Downing, 1/6th Battalion, Royal Warwickshire Regiment
Temp Lieutenant Gerald Jerome Eastburn, General List
2nd Lieutenant Hugh Cecil Allen Edwards, 2nd Battalion, Royal Warwickshire Regiment
Temp 2nd Lieutenant Thomas Harkness Galbraith, Royal Engineers, attd. Field Survey Company
Temp 2nd Lieutenant Harry Stephen Gawler, 9th Battalion, York & Lancaster Regiment
Lieutenant Leonard Albert Gibbs, 6th Battalion, Devonshire Regiment, attd. 9th Battalion
Captain Bernard Glasson, Royal Garrison Artillery, attd. 28th, now 391st, Siege Battery
2nd Lieutenant Leonard Tom Goodenough, 1/4th Battalion, Royal Berkshire Regiment
Captain William Gordon, 2nd Battalion, Gordon Highlanders
Temp Captain Arthur Ethelbert Griffin, 101st Field Company, Royal Engineers
Temp 2nd Lieutenant John Frederick Guttridge, 9th Battalion, Yorkshire Regiment
Lieutenant John Baieley Hales, 1st Buckinghamshire Battalion, Oxfordshire & Buckinghamshire Light Infantry
Quartermaster and Captain Charles Harding, 1/8th Battalion, Royal Warwickshire Regiment
Captain Samuel Stuart Harris, 1/6th Battalion, Gloucestershire Regiment, attd. 145th Trench Mortar Battery
Temp 2nd Lieutenant John Thomas Harrison, attd. South Staffordshire Regiment (1st Battalion)
Lieutenant Reginald Heather, 2nd Battalion, Honourable Artillery Company
Temp 2nd Lieutenant James Hedley, 23rd Battalion, Machine Gun Corps
Temp 2nd Lieutenant John Herrington, 9th Battalion, South Staffordshire Regiment
Temp Captain Frank Wilson Hird, 10th Battalion, Northumberland Fusiliers
Lieutenant Horatio Francis Horton, 5th Battalion, Suffolk Regiment, attd. 11th Battalion, West Yorkshire Regiment
Temp Captain Adderley Fitzalan Bernard Howard, 13th Battalion, Durham Light Infantry
Rev. Thomas Joseph James, Royal Army Chaplains' Department, attd. 70th Infantry Brigade
Temp Lieutenant Thomas King, 54th Field Company, Royal Engineers
Lieutenant Frank Robson Kirkley, Royal Field Artillery, attd. 102nd Brigade
Lieutenant Ralph Smith Leake, 1/7th Battalion, Worcestershire Regiment
Temp 2nd Lieutenant Albert George Lewis, D Battery, 103rd Brigade, Royal Field Artillery
Lieutenant Eric Carl Lightbody, 477th (South Midland) Field Company, Royal Engineers
Captain Kenneth Morley Loch, V A.A. Battery, Royal Field Artillery
Lieutenant James Edward Mackay, 1/4th Battalion, Oxfordshire & Buckinghamshire Light Infantry
Temp Captain Alexander Hepburn Macklin  Royal Army Medical Corps, attd. 11th Battalion, West Yorkshire Regiment
Temp Lieutenant Donald Edward May, attd. Royal Welsh Fusiliers (1st Battalion)
Temp 2nd Lieutenant Norman Millar, 8th Battalion, Yorkshire Regiment
2nd Lieutenant Cyril Llewellyn Morris, 1/6th Battalion, Gloucestershire Regiment
Temp Lieutenant Russell Williams Newcomb, Signal Company, Royal Engineers, General Headquarters
Quartermaster and Captain Edward Nichol, Buckinghamshire Battalion, Oxfordshire & Buckinghamshire Light Infantry
Rev. Hubert Noke, Royal Army Chaplains' Department
Temp 2nd Lieutenant John Harrill Pearse, 9th Battalion, York & Lancaster Regiment
Captain William Noel Pharazyn, 35th Brigade, Royal Field Artillery
Captain Lionel George Pilkington, 3rd Battalion, Royal Warwickshire Regiment
Lieutenant Leonard Cecil Plews, Gordon Highlanders, attd. 2nd Battalion
Lieutenant Eustace John Priddey, Yorkshire Light Infantry, attd. 8th Battalion
Captain Geoffry Swabery Ridout, 7th Divisional Signal Company, Royal Engineers
Temp 2nd Lieutenant William Arthur Sharpe, 9th Battalion, Yorkshire Regiment
Temp 2nd Lieutenant Frederick Harry Skiller, 23rd Battalion, Machine Gun Corps
Temp Lieutenant Allan Chalmers Smith, Royal Field Artillery
Temp 2nd Lieutenant Thomas Smithson, 12th Battalion, Durham Light Infantry
Lieutenant Edmund Osborn Springfield, Norfolk Regiment, sec. to 7th Battalion, Machine Gun Corps
Captain Harry Stead, 102nd Brigade, Royal Field Artillery
Temp 2nd Lieutenant George Clifford Sugden, 10th Battalion, West Riding Regiment
Temp Captain Angus Taylor, 285th A.T. Company, Royal Engineers
2nd Lieutenant John Charles Deans Taylor, Royal Garrison Artillery, attd. 247th Siege Battery, Royal Garrison Artillery
Lieutenant Eric Westbury Thompstone, Shropshire Light Infantry, attd. 1/4th Battalion, Gloucestershire Regiment
Temp 2nd Lieutenant James Thomas Walley, 20th Battalion, Manchester Regiment
Temp 2nd Lieutenant John William Wilkinson, 8th Battalion, Yorkshire Regiment
Lieutenant Charles Skinner Wilson, Royal Field Artillery, attd. Headquarters, 102nd Brigade, Royal Field Artillery
Temp Lieutenant Neil Young Wilson, 11th Battalion, Northumberland Fusiliers, late 8th Battalion, North Staffordshire Regiment

For valuable services rendered in connection with Military Operations in Salonika:
Lieutenant Charles Addy, Royal Field Artillery
Temp Captain William Anderson, Royal Garrison Artillery
Lieutenant Edgar Andrew, 2nd Battalion, Cheshire Regiment
Lieutenant George William Arney, 2nd Battalion, East Lancashire Regiment
Lieutenant William Barnes Austin, Royal Garrison Artillery (S.E.)
Temp Captain John Dunstan Bavin, Royal Field Artillery
Lieutenant William Gordon Bayly, East Lancashire Regiment (S.B.), attd. 2nd Battalion
Lieutenant Herbert Dacre Beadon, Yorkshire Regiment, attd. 2nd Battalion, Shropshire Light Infantry
Lieutenant James Brindley Bettington, Shropshire Light Infantry, attd. 8th Battalion
Temp Captain Frank Robert Bloor  Royal Army Ordnance Corps
Temp Captain Chandos Eric Bone, Royal Field Artillery
Temp Captain Joseph Reginald Braddick, Royal Field Artillery
Captain Roderic Duncan Cameron  Royal Army Medical Corps (S.E.)
Temp Captain Geoffrey Carr, 8th Battalion, Shropshire Light Infantry
Temp 2nd Lieutenant John Bomany Rhys Challen, attd. Middlesex Regiment, 26th Battalion
Captain Campbell Manning Christie, Royal Garrison Artillery
Lieutenant William Gibson Cochrane, Royal Scots (S.E.), attd. 1st Battalion
Captain Mervyn Clement Cooper, Royal Army Medical Corps (S.E.)
Lieutenant Arthur John Moore Cooney, Royal Artillery
Temp Lieutenant Kenneth Fursdon Crang, attd. Duke of Cornwall's Light Infantry
Lieutenant Richard Bagnall Crawford, Pembroke Yeomanry, attd. 1st Battalion, Welsh Regiment
Temp Lieutenant Cedric Branscombe Davidson, Machine Gun Corps
Temp Captain Hilary Arthur Lancelot Donkin, 7th Battalion, Royal Berkshire Regiment
Temp Captain Charles Maitland Duncan, Royal Field Artillery
Lieutenant Thomas Dunn, 2/7th Battalion, Durham Light Infantry (T.F.), attd. Machine Gun Corps
Captain Walter Manoel Edwards, Royal Garrison Artillery
Captain Geoffrey Bede Egerton, Royal Army Medical Corps (S.E.)
Lieutenant Hugh Francis Bradshaw Garrett, E. Surr. R. and Machine Gun Corps
Captain Arthur Alexander Gemmell, 2nd Battalion, Cameron Highlanders
Lieutenant Nigel Manghan Gordon, 1st Battalion, Suffolk Regiment
Lieutenant Maurice John Griffith, Royal Field Artillery
Temp 2nd Lieutenant Thomas Bain Gunn, 2nd Battalion, Cheshire Regiment
Lieutenant Ernest Lynn Hill  Royal Inniskilling Fusiliers
Lieutenant Percy Albion Hitchcock, Royal Engineers
Lieutenant Arthur Edward Hewitt, Royal Garrison Artillery
Temp Captain George Bedingfield Holroyde, Royal Army Medical Corps
Temp Lieutenant Stanley Robertson Ince, Machine Gun Corps, attd. 2nd Garrison Battalion, Liverpool Regiment
Temp Lieutenant George Frederick Jackson, Royal Garrison Artillery
Lieutenant Charles Henry Kinnaird, Welsh Regiment
Lieutenant Alexander Bannatyne Stewart Laidlaw, Royal Engineers
Temp Captain Merlin Gordon Lubbock, Royal Field Artillery
Temp Lieutenant George Frederick Lowen, 10th Battalion, Royal Highlanders
Temp Captain Ernest Frederick Lyons, 10th Battalion, Devonshire Regiment
Lieutenant Henry Cuthbert Erroll Mauduit, 3rd Battalion, King's Royal Rifle Corps
Captain William Mackintosh, Lovat's Scouts Yeomanry, attd. 10th Battalion Cameron Highlanders
Temp Lieutenant Douglas Bruce Merrie, 7th Battalion, Oxfordshire & Buckinghamshire Light Infantry
Temp Captain William George Moore, Royal Garrison Artillery
Temp Captain Frank William Morgan, Royal Field Artillery
Captain Fred George Morgan, 1st Battalion, York & Lancaster Regiment
Captain Thomas Silvian Morris, Rifle Brigade, attd. Machine Gun Corps
Sergeant Major Rowland Ernest Neville, 7th Battalion, Royal Berkshire Regiment
Captain Douglas Howard Nicholson, 1st Battalion, Royal Scots
Lieutenant Montagu Horatio Nelson Aubrey Noble, Royal Highlanders, attd. 10th Battalion
Captain William James Norman, Royal Engineers
Temp Lieutenant John Stephens Oldham, East Lancashire Regiment, attd. 9th Battalion
Temp Captain William Alfred Pickard, 11th Battalion, Royal Welsh Fusiliers
Rev. Jeremiah Pigott, Royal Army Chaplains' Department
Lieutenant John William Pitt, Royal Field Artillery
Rev. Thomas Ceredig Phillips, Royal Army Chaplains' Department
Temp Lieutenant Harold Kemp Prossor, 2nd Battalion, Gloucestershire Regiment, attd. Trench Mortar Battery
Rev. William Loyd Musgrave Protheroe  Royal Army Chaplains' Department
Lieutenant William Robert Reeve, 3/6th Battalion, East Surrey Regiment (T.F), attd. 2nd Battalion
Rev. Charles Robertson, Royal Army Chaplains' Department
Captain Cecil Bruce Robertson, 1st Battalion, Argyll and Sutherland Highlanders
Temp Captain Wallace Roderick Duncan Robertson, Royal Field Artillery
Temp Captain Osborne Victor Maude Roxby, General List
Lieutenant Michael Charles Stanley Sadler, 1/1st Derby Yeomanry
Lieutenant John Dee Shapland, Royal Garrison Artillery
Captain Leonard James Sheil  Royal Army Medical Corps
Lieutenant Clive Smith, 2nd Battalion, Northumberland Fusiliers
Temp Lieutenant Ian Sugden Smith, attd. Royal Scots Fusiliers, 8th Battalion
Temp Captain Millie Don Stott, 9th Battalion, Border Regiment
Temp 2nd Lieutenant Eric Mansfield Stuart, 12th Battalion, Cheshire Regiment
Temp Lieutenant Alastair Theodore Whitmarsh Stukeley, 7th Battalion, Oxfordshire & Buckinghamshire Light Infantry
Lieutenant Clive Errington Temperley, 4th Battalion, Rifle Brigade
2nd Lieutenant Arthur Edward Thompson, Royal Garrison Artillery
2nd Lieutenant William Todd, Royal Field Artillery
2nd Lieutenant John Tomlin, 6th Battalion, Nottinghamshire and Derbyshire Regiment, attd. 11th Battalion, Scottish Rifles
Captain Herbert Watt Torrance  Royal Army Medical Corps
Temp Lieutenant Stanley Neville Ure, Machine Gun Corps
Temp Lieutenant Arthur Cyril Waterfield, 8th Battalion, Shropshire Light Infantry, attd. 66th Trench Mortar Battery
Temp Captain Hubert Leslie Westlake, 7th Battalion, Wiltshire Regiment
Lieutenant John Virtue Whitelaw, Royal Field Artillery, attd. Royal Garrison Artillery
Temp Lieutenant William John Williams, 1st Battalion, Welsh Regiment
Captain Leonard Henry Wootton  Royal Army Medical Corps

For distinguished service in connection with Military Operations in North Russia
2nd Lieutenant Ernest W. Michelson, Special List

Awarded a Bar to the Military Cross (MC*) 
Lieutenant Percy Bayliss  attd. 16th Battalion, Royal Scots
Lieutenant John Burgon Bickersteth  Royal Dragoons
Temp Captain James Biggam  Royal Army Medical Corps
Captain Edwin John Bradley  Royal Army Medical Corps, attd. 1/3rd (N. Mid) Field Ambulance
Temp Captain Frank Leslie Brown  17th Battalion, King's Royal Rifle Corps, attd. Headquarters, 117th Infantry Brigade
Rev. Father John O'Reordan Browne  Royal Army Chaplains' Department, attd. 2/4th Battalion, North Lancashire Regiment
Temp Lieutenant William Burns  18th Battalion Machine Gun Corps
Lieutenant Mathew Carr  formerly Royal Scots Fusiliers, attd. 102nd Infantry Brigade
Captain Harold Vincent Spencer Charrington  12th Lancers
2nd Lieutenant Cyril Wardlaw Distin  attd. 28th Brigade
Captain Henry Charles Hamilton Eden  Royal Field Artillery, formerly Royal Artillery, Headquarters, 59th Division
Temp Quartermaster and Lieutenant Reginald Isaac Fairfax  10th Battalion, Cheshire Regiment
Temp Captain Thomas Raleigh Gibbs  2nd Battalion, Highland Light Infantry
Temp Captain Ronald Owen Hall  General List
Temp 2nd Lieutenant James Montgomery Hamilton  10th Battalion, Lancashire Fusiliers
Captain John David Hills  1/5th Battalion, Leicestershire Regiment
Lieutenant William Thomas O'Reilly  Middlesex Regiment, attd. 2nd Battalion, Hampshire Regiment
2nd Lieutenant Elton Walter Pickles  8th Battalion, Worcestershire Regiment T.F., attd. 3rd Battalion
Lieutenant Walter Rhind  409th Field Company, Royal Engineers
Captain Frederick Joseph Rice  C/82nd Brigade, Royal Field Artillery
Temp Lieutenant Gleeson Edward Robinson  Royal Field Artillery, attd. 17th Division, Trench Mortar Battery
2nd Lieutenant Stanley Flemyng Sanders  Royal Garrison Artillery, attd. 139th S. Battery
Temp Captain Edward Owen Sewell  General List
Lieutenant William Henry Tamlyn  504th (Wessex) Field Company, Royal Engineers
2nd Lieutenant Denys Redward Vachell  12th Field Company, Royal Engineers
Lieutenant Thomas Dewar Weldon  Royal Field Artillery, attd. Headquarters 45th Brigade
Temp Lieutenant Edward Augustus Wheatley  3rd Field Sqdn, Royal Engineers
Temp Captain William Uttamare White  Royal Garrison Artillery, attd. 87th S. Battery
Lieutenant Arthur Wingate Wingate  1st Dragoons

Canadian Force
Captain Edwin Day  5th Battalion, Canadian Infantry
Temp Captain James Nisbet Edgar  Princess Patricia's Canadian Light Infantry
Lieutenant James Cowan Franklin  Canadian Corps, HQ Signal Company, Canadian Engineers
Lieutenant William Francis McGovern  13th Battalion, Canadian Infantry
Lieutenant Thomas Burnham Woodyatt  58th Battalion, Canadian Infantry

Australian Imperial Force
Lieutenant Maurice Alfred Fergusson  10th Brigade, Australian Field Artillery
Captain William Dane Wallis  Headquarters, 5th Australian Divisional Artillery

South African Force
Temp Captain Edward Gordelier Ridley  74th S. Battery, Royal Garrison Artillery (South African Horse Artillery)

For services rendered in connection with Military Operations in Italy:
Lieutenant Neal William Matheson  Royal Engineers
Lieutenant Francis Dudley Rugman  1/6th Battalion, Gloucestershire Regiment
Temp 2nd Lieutenant Edward Kent Waite  10th Battalion, West Riding Regiment

For valuable services rendered in connection with Military Operations in Salonika:
Lieutenant Patrick John Tottenham Pickthall  Royal Garrison Artillery

Awarded a Second Bar to the Military Cross (MC**) 
Temp Captain Ronald Rawson Rawson  19th Divisional Signal Company, Royal Engineers
Captain Hugh Kingsley Ward  Royal Army Medical Corps, attd. 2nd Battalion, King's Royal Rifle Corps

Distinguished Flying Cross (DFC) 
Lieutenant William Melville Ackery
Lieutenant Allan Percy Adams
Lieutenant Douglas Alliban
Lieutenant Thomas Craig Annan
Major Anthony Rex Arnold 
Lieutenant Edward Enos Arnold
Major Frederick Cecil Baker 
Lieutenant Leonard William Baker
Captain Sidney Ernest Ball
Captain David Moar Ballantyne
Lieutenant Albert Frederick Bartlett
Lieutenant Frederick Gordon Bayley
Captain Rene Maurice Bayley
Lieutenant James Alexander Beeney
Lieutenant Bernard John Everest Belcher
Lieutenant William Bentley
Captain George William Biles
Acting Captain Thomas Gerald Glyn Bolitho 
Lieutenant Ralph Bolton
Lieutenant James Boyd
Lieutenant Neville Isaac Brockbank
Lieutenant Reginald Frederick Browne
Lieutenant William Edward Bryan
Lieutenant Wilfred James Buchanan
Lieutenant-Colonel Henry Meyrick Cave-Browne-Cave 
Lieutenant Sydney James Chamberlain
Captain Cecil John Clayton
Lieutenant Lionel John Collier
Lieutenant Herbert Melbourne Coombs
Captain Ebenezer Bertram Cowell
Captain Rupert Edward Darnton
Lieutenant Robert Ernest Lloyd Davies
Lieutenant Harold George Davis
Major Charles Herbert Dixon 
Captain Kenneth Town Dowding
Lieutenant John Ellingham
Lieutenant Sidney Samuel Flook
Captain Wilfred Forsyth Norman Forrest
Lieutenant Leslie Robert Fox
Lieutenant Eric John Furlong
Lieutenant Arthur Stuart Girling
Lieutenant Thomas Crowther Gordon
Lieutenant Acheson Gosford Goulding  Canadian Local Forces
Captain Ronald Grahame 
Lieutenant Charles Bremner Green, Canadian Local Forces
Lieutenant James Duff Guild
Captain Francis Neville Halstead
Lieutenant Earl McNabb Hand
2nd Lieutenant Frederick Joseph Haney 
Captain Henry Ivan Hanmer
Lieutenant Norman Roy Harben
Captain Edmund Parfitt Hardman
2nd Lieutenant George Henry Alexander Hart
Lieutenant Peter Haworth
Lieutenant Harold Hillier
Captain Walter George Raymond Hinchliffe
Lieutenant John Hodgson
Lieutenant George William Holderness
Lieutenant John Richard Hopkins
Lieutenant Francis Thomas Rattray Kempster
Captain Walter Robert Kenny
Lieutenant Leslie Lindo King
Lieutenant George Martin Lees 
Lieutenant Douglas Fairlie Lepraik
Captain Reginald Frederick Stuart Leslie 
Lieutenant Isaac Wyper Leiper
Lieutenant George Alexander Lingham
2nd Lieutenant James Macdonald (No. 6 Group, Adriatic)
Lieutenant Malcolm MacEwan
Major Charles Joseph Mackay 
2nd Lieutenant Dugald MacDougall
Lieutenant Earle Fraser McIlraith
Lieutenant Frank Melville McLellan
Captain Philip Herbert Mackworth
Lieutenant Harvey Lancelot Macro
Captain Bertram Alexander Malet
Lieutenant John Leonard Mayer
2nd Lieutenant William Miller
Lieutenant David Fraser Murray
Lieutenant Jaffrey John Walter Nicholson
Captain Harry Lawrence Nunn 
2nd Lieutenant Osborne John Orr
2nd Lieutenant Augustus Paget
Lieutenant Frederick William Pickup
2nd Lieutenant Colin Patrick Primrose
Lieutenant-Colonel William Harold Primrose
Major John Charles Quinnell
Lieutenant Walter Ridley, Canadian Engineers
Lieutenant-Colonel Edmund Digby Maxwell Robertson
Lieutenant Frederick Vernon Robinson (Canadian M.R.)
2nd Lieutenant Ian Robert Lawther Ross
Lieutenant George Henry Russell
Captain William Leopold Samson
Lieutenant Frederick Herbert St. Clair Sargant
Major Richard Ernest Saul
Captain Charles Winter Scott
Captain Robert Henry Sharp
Lieutenant Victor Donald Siddons
Captain Ronald Davidson Simpson
Captain Leonard Horatio Slatter 
Major Bernard Edward Smythies
Lieutenant Robert Geddes Spence
2nd Lieutenant James Humphrey Sprott
2nd Lieutenant Henry McDermott Starke
Captain Claude Harry Stokes
Lieutenant Edwin Curtis Robinson Stoneman
Lieutenant Stephen Charles Strafford
Lieutenant Hedworth Williamson Tait
Captain Godfrey Maine Thomas
Lieutenant William Miles Thomas
Lieutenant Thomas William Gordon Thompson
Captain Thomas George Thornton 
2nd Lieutenant Geoffrey Beauchamp Treadwell
Lieutenant Frederick Culborne Vincent
Lieutenant Charles Frederick Allan Wagstaff
Captain Henry James Wiser, Canadian Infantry
Captain John Arthur Yonge

Awarded a Bar to the Distinguished Flying Cross (DFC*) 
Captain Keith Logan Caldwell 
Lieutenant Robert Halley 
Lieutenant Thomas Walter Nash

Distinguished Flying Medal (DFM) 
In recognition of valuable services rendered with the British Forces in Italy:
Sergeant Mechanic Samuel Eli Allatson (Southend-on-Sea)
Sergeant Mechanic Robert Allen (Fochabers)
Sergeant Mechanic Cecil George Tennyson Bishop (Wimbledon)
Corporal Mechanic Richard Brock (Ontario, Can.)
Sergeant Mechanic Edwin Charles Carpenter (King's Lynn)
Sergeant Mechanic Romald Charles-Chapman (Manor Park, London)
Sergeant Mechanic Charles William Cooke, East Lancashire Regiment, attd. Royal Air Force
Air Mechanic, 2nd Class William Edwards (Boston, Spa)
Air Mechanic, 3rd Class William Kimberley Foster (West Hampstead, London)
Sergeant Edward Hoare (Acton Vale)
Sergeant Mechanic Trevor Hooton (Cardiff)
Sergeant Mechanic William Henry Hoskin (Fulham, London)
Air Mechanic, 2nd Class William Owen Hughes (Anglesey)
Air Mechanic, 3rd Class Arthur Stanley Jones (Levenshulme)
Sergeant Mechanic George Stanley Keen (High Wycombe)
Air Mechanic, 1st Class Charles William Lamb (Wolverhampton)
Air Mechanic, 3rd Class Alexander Lindsay (Milngavie)
Sergeant Mechanic Ernest George-Maund (Ilford)
Sergeant Mechanic John Henry Matthews (Cardiff)
Air Mechanic, 1st Class Reginald Arthur Miller (Balham, London)
Sergeant Meah. Malcolm Frederick George Mill (Poplar)
Sergeant Mechanic Ewart Oswald Norris (Cheltenham)
Sergeant Mechanic Peroival George Phillips (East Ham)
Sergeant Mechanic Christopher James-Shannon (Stamford Hill, London)
Sergeant Mechanic Eric Gordon Stevens, Lancashire Fusiliers, attd. Royal Air Force)
Corporal Clerk Frank Frederick Thomas (Sandown, Isle of Wight)
Sergeant Mechanic Frank Leslie Clive-Thornton (Blandford)
Corporal Mechanic Alfred Edward Tucker (Watford)
Corporal Frederick Thomas Wallacefanning Town, London)
Sergeant Mechanic William Edward David Wardrop (Fulham)
Sergeant Mechanic Victor Gordon Warnock (Kidderminster)

Air Force Cross (AFC) 
Major Leslie Peech Aizlewood 
Captain Ellis Anthony, Canadian Militia
Captain William Henry Shields Aplin
Lieutenant George Hughes Armstrong
Captain Edward Dawson Atkinson 
Captain Joseph Dover Atkinson
Captain Ernest Arthur Oliphant Auldjo-Jamieson
Major Philip Babington 
2nd Lieutenant William Dodds Haldane Baird
Captain Brian Edward Baker 
Lieutenant Edward Gentleman Bannister
Lieutenant Frank Bell Baragar
Captain Frank Sowter Barnwell 
Captain Stanley Bell
Captain Vivian Arthur Fenton Bellamy
Captain Seymour Stewart Benson
2nd Lieutenant Archer Ormonde Binding
Lieutenant Joseph Wesley Lightbourne Birkbeck
Captain Alfred Montague Blake
Captain Alfred Gordon Bond
Lieutenant The Honourable Alan Reginald Boyle (Balloon Section)
Lieutenant Allan Boyle 
Captain Norman Brearley 
Lieutenant Godfrey Bremridge
Lieutenant Bertie Sandel Brice
Colonel Henry Robert Moore Brooke-Popham 
2nd Lieutenant Richard John Brotherton, South African Forces
2nd Lieutenant Leonard Desborough Brown
Captain Henry John Butler
Lieutenant-Colonel Henry Richard Busteed 
Lieutenant David Vaughan Carnegie
Lieutenant Reginald Sheridan Carroll
Lieutenant Morris Drinkwater Carver
Lieutenant Paul Richard Tankerville Chamberlayne
Major Robert Arthur Chalmers 
Lieutenant Douglas Alwyn Rougier Chapman
Lieutenant Victor Charles Chapman
Lieutenant Henry Richard Clarke
Captain Frank Cleary
Captain John Alexander Coats
Captain Ralph Alexander Cochrane
Major The Honourable Roger Coke
Captain John Patrick Coleman
Major Arthur Quilton Cooper 
Captain Alexander Robb Cox
Captain Arthur George Davis
Captain Ronald Eric Dean
Lieutenant Desmond Herlooin de Burgh
Captain Geoffrey de Havilland 
Lieutenant Émile Henri de Heaume
Captain Hedley Vicars Drew
Lieutenant Charles Herbert Drew
Lieutenant Reginald Threlkeld Edwards
Captain Thomas Walker Elmhirst
Lieutenant Sven Eric Faber
Captain Charles Osborn Fairbairn
Captain Joseph Stewart Temple Fall 
Lieutenant-Colonel Charles Robert Finch-Noyes 
Lieutenant-Colonel John Norman Fletcher
Lieutenant Norman Graham Fraser
Lieutenant Edward David George Galley 
Lieutenant Harold Fraser Game
Lieutenant Gerald William Gathergood
Captain Alfred Herbert Harold Gilligan
Captain Albert Earl Godfrey 
Lieutenant John Henry Gotch
Major Douglas Harries
Major Irving Henry Bibby Hartford
Captain Charles Samuel Hay
Lieutenant Stephen Hay
Captain Harold Hemming
Major Swithin Gane Hodges 
Captain Walter Thomas Forrest Holland
Major Ralph James Jean Hope-Vere
Lieutenant Frank Lindon Hopps
Lieutenant John Leitch Home
Major Thomas O'Brien Hubbard 
Lieutenant Frederick Irwin Jacks
Lieutenant Clarence Jackson
Captain Douglas Grahame Joy, Canadian M.R.
Captain John Harvey Keens
Captain Harold Spencer Kerby
Lieutenant Ralph Imray Barton
Captain Edwin Middleton Knott
2nd Lieutenant Charles Victor Lacey
Lieutenant Thomas Audley Langford-Sainsbury
Lieutenant Eardley Haydon Lawford
Captain John Owen Leach 
Captain Thomas Orde Hans Lees
Captain Ivo Cecil Little
Colonel Charles Alexander Hoicombe Longcroft 
Captain Ernest Vincent Longinotto
Captain Geoffrey Lyttleton Lowis
Captain James Steel Maitland
Lieutenant-Colonel Francis Kennedy McClean
Captain Cedric Yeats McDonald
Captain Ian Macdonald
Lieutenant Ivor Ewing McIntyre
Captain William Gordon McMinnies
Lieutenant Theodore Marburg
Captain Peter Henry Martin
Captain Thomas John Clement Martyn 
Lieutenant James Arthur Ryerson Mason
Colonel Edward Alexander Dimsdale Masterman 
2nd Lieutenant Thomas Frederick Mathewson
Captain Edward Morgan Morgan
Lieutenant Cyrus Maxwell Mortimer
2nd Lieutenant John Morton
Major Eric Roper Curzon Nanson 
Lieutenant William Eric Nicholson
Major Sidney Ernest Parker 
Captain Cyril Patteson 
Lieutenant-Colonel Richard Edmund Charles Peirse 
Lieutenant George Beacoll Powell
2nd Lieutenant Arthur Gwynne Power
Lieutenant Raphael Chevallier Preston
Major Conway Walter Heath Pulford
Captain William Ronald Read 
Lieutenant Leo James Riordan
Captain Hugh Anselm Boulton Robb 
Captain Brian Kyte David Robertson
Lieutenant Douglas Hall Robertson
Captain William Roche-Kelly
Lieutenant-Colonel Charles Rumney Samson 
Captain Robert Henry Magnus Spencer Saundby 
Lieutenant-Colonel Alan John Lance Scott 
Major George Herbert Scott
Major James Stanley Scott 
Captain Walter Somerville Scott 
Lieutenant James Orrok Simpson
Lieutenant Malcolm Millard Sisley
Lieutenant Harry Slingsby
Lieutenant Bernard Valentine Seymour Smith 
Lieutenant Gerald Dent Smith
Captain Percy William Snell
Major Frederick Sowrey 
Major William Sowrey
Captain Arthur Sparrow
2nd Lieutenant Cowan Douglas Stephenson
Lieutenant John Clifford Stockman
Captain Charles Howe Stocks
Captain Ronald Scott Sugden
Captain John A. Sully, Alberta Regiment
Lieutenant Edric Tasker
Major George Stanley Trewin
Captain Cyril Jameson Truran
Captain George Mark Turnbull
Captain Harley Alec Tweedie
Lieutenant Harold Ridlington Hunter Ward
Captain Seigfried Ricards Watkins
Lieutenant Francis Vivian Way
Lieutenant Robert Marychurch Whitmore
Captain Lloyd Whitworth
Captain Percival Wickens
Captain James Norris Wilson
Major John Philip Wilson 
Captain Bernard Cyril Windeler
Lieutenant Ambrose Oliver Keeton Wright
Lieutenant James Alfred Snarey Wright
Captain William Alan Wright
Lieutenant Arthur Mostyn Wray 
Lieutenant Harold Clare Young, Canadian Machine Gun Corps

Air Force Medal (AFM) 
In recognition of valuable services rendered with the British Forces in Italy:
Corporal Mechanic Elmo Bearden (Brooklyn)
Air Mechanic, 2nd Class William Herbert Brown (Croydon)
Chief Mechanic Arthur Ernest Close (Glasgow)
Mechanist Sergeant Sidney Redvers-Cole (Chesham, Bedfordshire)
Chief Mechanic Cecil Jebson Cox (York)
Air Mechanic, 1st Class Harold Frank Crespin (Felixstowe)
Chief Mechanic Albert Edward Easterbrook (Portsmouth)
Chief Mechanic George William Hunt (Peterhead)
Chief Mechanic John William Long (Gosport)
Chief Mechanic Hubert Wilfred Newitt (Goodmayes)
Sergeant Mechanic William Fred Paull (Bitton, Gloucs.)
Corporal Mechanic James Moran Quailr D.S.M. (Cloratarf, Dublin)
Sergeant Mechanic Walter Rogers (Vauxhall)
Air Mechanic, 1st Class Stephen Leonard Starr (Richmond, Surrey)

Distinguished Conduct Medal (DCM)

Meritorious Service Medal (MSM)

Military Medal (MM) 
Chief Master-Mechanic Laurence Grant Miles (Harlesden)

King's Police Medal (KPM) 

England and Wales
Police
Francis Caldwell  Chief Constable, Liverpool City Police
Lieutenant-Colonel Alan Chichester, Chief Constable, Huntingdon County Constabulary
John Allen, Superintendent and Deputy-Chief Constable, Gloucester County Constabulary
Arthur Ernest Bassom, Superintendent, Metropolitan Police
Robert John Burton, Superintendent, West Riding Constabulary
John Chandler, Superintendent, Nottingham County Police
Benjamin Davies, Acting Superintendent, Cardiff City Police
John Spendlove, Chief Superintendent, Stafford County Constabulary
Arthur Richard Bellamy, Constable, Metropolitan Police
Frank Bryant, Constable, Metropolitan Police
Thomas William Bubb, Constable, West Sussex Constabulary
John Glass Colligan, Constable, Birkenhead Borough Police
David Davies, Constable, Metropolitan Police
Charles Kidd, Constable, Metropolitan Police
Thomas Edwin Moore, Constable, Great Yarmouth Borough Police
Francis Stubbs, Constable, Metropolitan Police

Fire Brigades
Frederick Gibbons Croasdell, Superintendent, Edmonton Fire Brigade
Alfred Johnson, Chief Officer, Ramsgate Fire Brigade
Alfred Robert Tozer, Chief Officer, Birmingham Fire Brigade
Frederick Bambridge Willis, Senior Superintendent, London Fire Brigade
John Morgan Home (deceased), Second Officer, Southgate Volunteer Fire Brigade
Thomas Matthew Crowe, Station Officer, London Fire Brigade
Walter Knight Hanscombe (deceased), Fireman, Southgate Volunteer Fire Brigade
Hariph Robert Taylor, Fireman, Colne Fire Brigade

Scotland
Police
William Anderson, Chief Constable, Aberdeen City Police
John McGimpsey, Chief Detective Inspector, City of Glasgow Police
Alexander Hay, Constable, Nairn County Constabulary
Alexander Macvicar, Constable, Inverness County Constabulary

Fire Brigades
James Sinclair Weir, Firemaster, Dundee

Ireland
Police
George Ftzgerald William Craig, District Inspector, Royal Irish Constabulary
Martin Boyle, Head Constable, Royal Irish Constabulary
John Browne, Head Constable, Royal Irish Constabulary
John Allingham Johnston, Superintendent, Belfast Harbour Police
Michael Flanagan, Sergeant, Royal Irish Constabulary
Patrick Hefferman, Sergeant, Dublin Metropolitan Police
Thomas Hynes, Constable, Royal Irish Constabulary
Thomas Reid, Constable, Dublin Metropolitan Police

Fire Brigades
Edward Doyle, Member of the City of Dublin Fire Brigade
Joseph Lynch, Member of the City of Dublin Fire Brigade

British India
Frank Seaver Scottney George, Superintendent, Madras Police
Khan Babadur Muhammad Amin-ud-Dm Sahib, Deputy Superintendent, Madras Police
Paramanandam Pillai Duraswami Pillai  Inspector, Madras Police
Abdul Quadir Sahib, Constable, Madras Police
Vithoo Jagojee Bihonslay Jamadar, Bombay City Police
Frederick George Collett, Assistant Superintendent, Bombay Police
Yadav Sadoba, Constable, Bombay Police
Rajawali Nadirkhan, Acting Head Constable, Bombay Police
Bhagwan Luxman, Head Constable, Bombay Police
Umar Buran, Inspector, Bombay Police
Khan Saheb Shaikh Ahmed Shaikh Baud, Headquarters, Chief Constable, Bombay Police
James William Fellowes, District Superintendent, Bombay Police
Edwin Alfred John Barnes, Senior Inspector, Aden Police
Bijoy Narayan Basu, Inspector, Bengal Police
Phanindra Kumar Basu, Inspector, Bengal Police
Ban Behari Mukherji, Inspector, Beoigal Police
Rasik Lai Basu, Officiating Sub-Inspector, Bengal Police
Aonrita Lai Bhattacharji, Inspector, Bengal Police
Shamsuddahar, Sub-Inspector, Bengal Police
Nityananda Nandi, Sub-Inspector, Bengal Police
Hajari Lall Mukherji, Inspector, Bengal Police
Brian Wardle, Officiating Additional Superintendent, Bengal Police
Prafulla, Kumar Biswas, Inspector, Bengal Police
Basanta Kumar Mukerji, Officiating Inspector, Bengal Police
Musleh-ud-din, Head Constable, United Provinces Police
Muhammad Sihafiq, Constable, United Provinces Police
Robert John Sherwood Dodd, Superintendent, United Provinces Police
Henry Robert Sharpe, Deputy Inspector-General, United Provinces Police
William Edmund Botting, Executive Officer Lucknow Fire Brigade
Agha Saadat Ali Khan  Deputy Superintendent, Punjab Police
Khan Sahib Munshi Ghulam Rasul, Deputy Superintendent, Punjab Police
Hakim Ikram-ul-Hag, Temporary Deputy Superintendent, Punjab Police
Sardar Anup Singh, Inspector, Punjab Police
Lancelot Colin Bradford Clascock  Superintendent, Punjab Police
Sydney Jennings, District Superintendent Burma Police
Shanker Singh, 2nd grade Subadar, Burma Military Police
Maung Ba, 1st grade Head Constable, Burma Police
Maung Hla Baw, Deputy Superintendent, Burma Police
Walter Swain, Superintendent, Bihar and Orissa Police
John Dun Boylan, Superintendent, Bihar and Orissa Police
Wilfred Arthur Prince Sealy, Superintendent, Bihar and Orissa Police
Rai Bahadur Sri Krishna Mahapatra, Deputy Superintendent, Bihar and Orissa Police
Allan Stainer Hayling, Inspector, Bihar and Orissa Police
Dandi Ram Salai, Constable, Assam Police
Chandi Ram Katoni, Constable, Assam Police 
Subadar Bhowan Singh Bight, Assam Rifles Subadar Pokul Thapa, Assam Rifles
John Murray Ewart, Superintendent, North-West Frontier Province Police
Umar Khan, Head Constable, North-West Frontier Province Police
Arthur Finch Perrott, Assistant Superintendent, North-West Frontier Province Police
Khan Bahadur Aga Jan, Subadar-Major, Andamans and Nicobar Police
Thakur Din, Constable, Central India Agency Police
Allen George Blanchett, Inspector, Ajmer Metwara Police

New South Wales
John Walker, Inspector, Criminal Investigation Branch of the Police Department
Nicholas George Sparks, Chief Officer of Fire Brigades
Frank Jackson, Deputy Chief Officer of Fire Brigades
Thomas George Cutts, District Officer of Fire Brigades
John Tait, Superintendent Metropolitan, Police District
John Joseph Wallace Water, Police Inspector, Sydney
Reverend Doctor Lewis Rousseau Scudder, American Aroot Mission, Madras
Walter Samuel Millard, Senior Partner, Messrs. Phipson and Company, Bombay

South Africa
Willeni Cornells van Kyneveld, Inspector, South African Police
Petrus Paulus Jacobus Botha, Lance Corporal, South African Police

Fiji
Josua, Constable, Fiji Constabulary

Jamaica
Michael Bernard O'Sullivan, Inspector of Constabulary
James Alexander Miller, 1st Class Constable and Detective
Thomas James Hazlett, Acting Deputy Inspector of Constabulary
Owen Franklin Wright, Inspector of Constabulary
William Nathaniel Black, Sergeant Major of Constabulary
Walter Maxwell Bernard, Sergeant Major of Constabulary
Charles Samuel Thomas, Sergeant of Constabulary

Leeward Islands
Major William Edward Wilders, Inspector of Police
Joseph Adolphus Byron, Lance Corporal of Police
George Adolptus Warner, Lance Corporal of Police
Edwin Ernest Thomas, Lance Corporal of Police
Edward A. Jones, Station Sergeant of Police

Nigeria
Captain Charles Edward Johnstone, late Inspector-General of Police, Southern Provinces
Edwin Stanhope Willoughby, late Assistant Superintendent of Police, Southern Provinces
John Radcliff, Assistant Commissioner of Police, Northern Provinces

East Africa
James Maddy Lumley, Assistant Superintendent of Police
David Marsh, 1st Class Constable

Uganda
William Younger, Temporary Assistant Superintendent of Police

Canada
Thomas Caulkin, Sergeant Major, Royal North-West Mounted Police

References

New Year Honours
1919 awards
1919 in Australia
1919 in Canada
1919 in India
1919 in New Zealand
1919 in the United Kingdom